

346001–346100 

|-bgcolor=#E9E9E9
| 346001 ||  || — || October 8, 2007 || Mount Lemmon || Mount Lemmon Survey || — || align=right | 2.0 km || 
|-id=002 bgcolor=#d6d6d6
| 346002 ||  || — || October 8, 2007 || Mount Lemmon || Mount Lemmon Survey || KOR || align=right | 1.5 km || 
|-id=003 bgcolor=#E9E9E9
| 346003 ||  || — || October 10, 2007 || Mount Lemmon || Mount Lemmon Survey || AGN || align=right | 1.1 km || 
|-id=004 bgcolor=#E9E9E9
| 346004 ||  || — || October 10, 2007 || Mount Lemmon || Mount Lemmon Survey || NEM || align=right | 2.1 km || 
|-id=005 bgcolor=#d6d6d6
| 346005 ||  || — || October 7, 2007 || Kitt Peak || Spacewatch || — || align=right | 2.5 km || 
|-id=006 bgcolor=#d6d6d6
| 346006 ||  || — || October 7, 2007 || Kitt Peak || Spacewatch || — || align=right | 2.8 km || 
|-id=007 bgcolor=#E9E9E9
| 346007 ||  || — || October 9, 2007 || Kitt Peak || Spacewatch || AGN || align=right | 1.2 km || 
|-id=008 bgcolor=#d6d6d6
| 346008 ||  || — || October 10, 2007 || Kitt Peak || Spacewatch || — || align=right | 3.4 km || 
|-id=009 bgcolor=#d6d6d6
| 346009 ||  || — || October 10, 2007 || Mount Lemmon || Mount Lemmon Survey || — || align=right | 4.7 km || 
|-id=010 bgcolor=#E9E9E9
| 346010 ||  || — || October 8, 2007 || Catalina || CSS || — || align=right | 2.6 km || 
|-id=011 bgcolor=#E9E9E9
| 346011 ||  || — || October 11, 2007 || Catalina || CSS || — || align=right | 2.7 km || 
|-id=012 bgcolor=#d6d6d6
| 346012 ||  || — || October 10, 2007 || Kitt Peak || Spacewatch || CHA || align=right | 2.5 km || 
|-id=013 bgcolor=#d6d6d6
| 346013 ||  || — || October 11, 2007 || Kitt Peak || Spacewatch || — || align=right | 2.3 km || 
|-id=014 bgcolor=#E9E9E9
| 346014 ||  || — || October 12, 2007 || Kitt Peak || Spacewatch || — || align=right | 1.9 km || 
|-id=015 bgcolor=#E9E9E9
| 346015 ||  || — || October 9, 2007 || Kitt Peak || Spacewatch || — || align=right | 3.2 km || 
|-id=016 bgcolor=#E9E9E9
| 346016 ||  || — || October 8, 2007 || Mount Lemmon || Mount Lemmon Survey || — || align=right | 2.8 km || 
|-id=017 bgcolor=#d6d6d6
| 346017 ||  || — || October 10, 2007 || Mount Lemmon || Mount Lemmon Survey || HYG || align=right | 4.0 km || 
|-id=018 bgcolor=#E9E9E9
| 346018 ||  || — || October 12, 2007 || Mount Lemmon || Mount Lemmon Survey || — || align=right | 1.7 km || 
|-id=019 bgcolor=#E9E9E9
| 346019 ||  || — || October 8, 2007 || Mount Lemmon || Mount Lemmon Survey || AST || align=right | 2.9 km || 
|-id=020 bgcolor=#d6d6d6
| 346020 ||  || — || October 11, 2007 || Mount Lemmon || Mount Lemmon Survey || — || align=right | 2.8 km || 
|-id=021 bgcolor=#d6d6d6
| 346021 ||  || — || October 12, 2007 || Kitt Peak || Spacewatch || KOR || align=right | 1.4 km || 
|-id=022 bgcolor=#E9E9E9
| 346022 ||  || — || October 11, 2007 || Kitt Peak || Spacewatch || GEF || align=right | 1.4 km || 
|-id=023 bgcolor=#d6d6d6
| 346023 ||  || — || October 11, 2007 || Kitt Peak || Spacewatch || EOS || align=right | 2.2 km || 
|-id=024 bgcolor=#d6d6d6
| 346024 ||  || — || October 15, 2007 || Kitt Peak || Spacewatch || KAR || align=right | 1.2 km || 
|-id=025 bgcolor=#E9E9E9
| 346025 ||  || — || October 8, 2007 || Mount Lemmon || Mount Lemmon Survey || AST || align=right | 1.4 km || 
|-id=026 bgcolor=#d6d6d6
| 346026 ||  || — || October 11, 2007 || Catalina || CSS || THB || align=right | 3.6 km || 
|-id=027 bgcolor=#d6d6d6
| 346027 ||  || — || October 14, 2007 || Mount Lemmon || Mount Lemmon Survey || — || align=right | 2.4 km || 
|-id=028 bgcolor=#d6d6d6
| 346028 ||  || — || October 14, 2007 || Mount Lemmon || Mount Lemmon Survey || — || align=right | 4.1 km || 
|-id=029 bgcolor=#E9E9E9
| 346029 ||  || — || October 9, 2007 || Mount Lemmon || Mount Lemmon Survey || BRU || align=right | 3.6 km || 
|-id=030 bgcolor=#E9E9E9
| 346030 ||  || — || October 13, 2007 || Catalina || CSS || — || align=right | 3.0 km || 
|-id=031 bgcolor=#d6d6d6
| 346031 ||  || — || October 14, 2007 || Kitt Peak || Spacewatch || KAR || align=right | 1.2 km || 
|-id=032 bgcolor=#d6d6d6
| 346032 ||  || — || October 14, 2007 || Kitt Peak || Spacewatch || CHA || align=right | 1.9 km || 
|-id=033 bgcolor=#d6d6d6
| 346033 ||  || — || October 15, 2007 || Catalina || CSS || — || align=right | 2.3 km || 
|-id=034 bgcolor=#d6d6d6
| 346034 ||  || — || October 15, 2007 || Kitt Peak || Spacewatch || — || align=right | 2.6 km || 
|-id=035 bgcolor=#d6d6d6
| 346035 ||  || — || October 15, 2007 || Kitt Peak || Spacewatch || — || align=right | 3.1 km || 
|-id=036 bgcolor=#E9E9E9
| 346036 ||  || — || October 15, 2007 || Anderson Mesa || LONEOS || — || align=right | 2.2 km || 
|-id=037 bgcolor=#E9E9E9
| 346037 ||  || — || October 3, 2007 || Siding Spring || SSS || — || align=right | 3.1 km || 
|-id=038 bgcolor=#d6d6d6
| 346038 ||  || — || September 13, 2007 || Catalina || CSS || URS || align=right | 3.8 km || 
|-id=039 bgcolor=#d6d6d6
| 346039 ||  || — || October 10, 2007 || Mount Lemmon || Mount Lemmon Survey || — || align=right | 2.9 km || 
|-id=040 bgcolor=#d6d6d6
| 346040 ||  || — || October 4, 2007 || Kitt Peak || Spacewatch || — || align=right | 2.0 km || 
|-id=041 bgcolor=#d6d6d6
| 346041 ||  || — || October 8, 2007 || Anderson Mesa || LONEOS || — || align=right | 3.8 km || 
|-id=042 bgcolor=#d6d6d6
| 346042 ||  || — || October 13, 2007 || Kitt Peak || Spacewatch || KOR || align=right | 1.3 km || 
|-id=043 bgcolor=#d6d6d6
| 346043 ||  || — || May 4, 2005 || Mount Lemmon || Mount Lemmon Survey || EOS || align=right | 2.4 km || 
|-id=044 bgcolor=#d6d6d6
| 346044 ||  || — || October 14, 2007 || Mount Lemmon || Mount Lemmon Survey || — || align=right | 3.2 km || 
|-id=045 bgcolor=#d6d6d6
| 346045 ||  || — || October 19, 2007 || La Cañada || J. Lacruz || FIR || align=right | 3.1 km || 
|-id=046 bgcolor=#d6d6d6
| 346046 ||  || — || October 16, 2007 || Mount Lemmon || Mount Lemmon Survey || — || align=right | 2.8 km || 
|-id=047 bgcolor=#d6d6d6
| 346047 ||  || — || October 18, 2007 || Mount Lemmon || Mount Lemmon Survey || KOR || align=right | 1.2 km || 
|-id=048 bgcolor=#d6d6d6
| 346048 ||  || — || October 16, 2007 || Kitt Peak || Spacewatch || FIR || align=right | 3.6 km || 
|-id=049 bgcolor=#d6d6d6
| 346049 ||  || — || October 16, 2007 || Kitt Peak || Spacewatch || KOR || align=right | 1.3 km || 
|-id=050 bgcolor=#d6d6d6
| 346050 ||  || — || October 16, 2007 || Kitt Peak || Spacewatch || CHA || align=right | 1.8 km || 
|-id=051 bgcolor=#d6d6d6
| 346051 ||  || — || October 19, 2007 || Kitt Peak || Spacewatch || MRC || align=right | 2.9 km || 
|-id=052 bgcolor=#d6d6d6
| 346052 ||  || — || October 19, 2007 || Anderson Mesa || LONEOS || — || align=right | 2.4 km || 
|-id=053 bgcolor=#d6d6d6
| 346053 ||  || — || October 18, 2007 || Anderson Mesa || LONEOS || — || align=right | 2.2 km || 
|-id=054 bgcolor=#E9E9E9
| 346054 ||  || — || October 19, 2007 || Catalina || CSS || NEM || align=right | 3.0 km || 
|-id=055 bgcolor=#d6d6d6
| 346055 ||  || — || October 16, 2007 || Kitt Peak || Spacewatch || — || align=right | 2.9 km || 
|-id=056 bgcolor=#d6d6d6
| 346056 ||  || — || October 18, 2007 || Kitt Peak || Spacewatch || — || align=right | 2.1 km || 
|-id=057 bgcolor=#d6d6d6
| 346057 ||  || — || October 20, 2007 || Mount Lemmon || Mount Lemmon Survey || — || align=right | 3.5 km || 
|-id=058 bgcolor=#d6d6d6
| 346058 ||  || — || October 24, 2007 || Mount Lemmon || Mount Lemmon Survey || — || align=right | 3.2 km || 
|-id=059 bgcolor=#d6d6d6
| 346059 ||  || — || October 30, 2007 || Kitt Peak || Spacewatch || NAE || align=right | 3.4 km || 
|-id=060 bgcolor=#d6d6d6
| 346060 ||  || — || October 30, 2007 || Kitt Peak || Spacewatch || — || align=right | 2.5 km || 
|-id=061 bgcolor=#E9E9E9
| 346061 ||  || — || October 18, 2007 || Kitt Peak || Spacewatch || — || align=right | 2.3 km || 
|-id=062 bgcolor=#d6d6d6
| 346062 ||  || — || October 30, 2007 || Mount Lemmon || Mount Lemmon Survey || — || align=right | 2.0 km || 
|-id=063 bgcolor=#E9E9E9
| 346063 ||  || — || October 30, 2007 || Catalina || CSS || — || align=right | 3.1 km || 
|-id=064 bgcolor=#d6d6d6
| 346064 ||  || — || October 30, 2007 || Kitt Peak || Spacewatch || KOR || align=right | 1.4 km || 
|-id=065 bgcolor=#d6d6d6
| 346065 ||  || — || October 30, 2007 || Kitt Peak || Spacewatch || — || align=right | 2.8 km || 
|-id=066 bgcolor=#d6d6d6
| 346066 ||  || — || October 30, 2007 || Kitt Peak || Spacewatch || — || align=right | 2.9 km || 
|-id=067 bgcolor=#d6d6d6
| 346067 ||  || — || October 30, 2007 || Kitt Peak || Spacewatch || — || align=right | 2.8 km || 
|-id=068 bgcolor=#d6d6d6
| 346068 ||  || — || October 30, 2007 || Kitt Peak || Spacewatch || K-2 || align=right | 1.7 km || 
|-id=069 bgcolor=#d6d6d6
| 346069 ||  || — || October 30, 2007 || Kitt Peak || Spacewatch || — || align=right | 2.8 km || 
|-id=070 bgcolor=#d6d6d6
| 346070 ||  || — || October 30, 2007 || Mount Lemmon || Mount Lemmon Survey || — || align=right | 3.0 km || 
|-id=071 bgcolor=#d6d6d6
| 346071 ||  || — || April 2, 2005 || Mount Lemmon || Mount Lemmon Survey || — || align=right | 2.4 km || 
|-id=072 bgcolor=#d6d6d6
| 346072 ||  || — || October 9, 2007 || Mount Lemmon || Mount Lemmon Survey || — || align=right | 2.5 km || 
|-id=073 bgcolor=#d6d6d6
| 346073 ||  || — || October 30, 2007 || Kitt Peak || Spacewatch || — || align=right | 3.0 km || 
|-id=074 bgcolor=#d6d6d6
| 346074 ||  || — || October 14, 2007 || Kitt Peak || Spacewatch || TIR || align=right | 3.8 km || 
|-id=075 bgcolor=#d6d6d6
| 346075 ||  || — || October 30, 2007 || Kitt Peak || Spacewatch || — || align=right | 2.5 km || 
|-id=076 bgcolor=#d6d6d6
| 346076 ||  || — || October 30, 2007 || Kitt Peak || Spacewatch || — || align=right | 2.9 km || 
|-id=077 bgcolor=#d6d6d6
| 346077 ||  || — || October 31, 2007 || Kitt Peak || Spacewatch || — || align=right | 3.2 km || 
|-id=078 bgcolor=#d6d6d6
| 346078 ||  || — || January 15, 2004 || Kitt Peak || Spacewatch || — || align=right | 2.5 km || 
|-id=079 bgcolor=#d6d6d6
| 346079 ||  || — || October 20, 2007 || Kitt Peak || Spacewatch || — || align=right | 2.1 km || 
|-id=080 bgcolor=#E9E9E9
| 346080 ||  || — || October 18, 2007 || Kitt Peak || Spacewatch || — || align=right | 2.2 km || 
|-id=081 bgcolor=#d6d6d6
| 346081 ||  || — || October 18, 2007 || Kitt Peak || Spacewatch || — || align=right | 2.9 km || 
|-id=082 bgcolor=#d6d6d6
| 346082 ||  || — || May 4, 2005 || Mount Lemmon || Mount Lemmon Survey || — || align=right | 2.6 km || 
|-id=083 bgcolor=#d6d6d6
| 346083 ||  || — || October 21, 2007 || Kitt Peak || Spacewatch || — || align=right | 2.4 km || 
|-id=084 bgcolor=#d6d6d6
| 346084 ||  || — || October 19, 2007 || Mount Lemmon || Mount Lemmon Survey || — || align=right | 4.7 km || 
|-id=085 bgcolor=#d6d6d6
| 346085 ||  || — || June 18, 2006 || Kitt Peak || Spacewatch || — || align=right | 2.7 km || 
|-id=086 bgcolor=#d6d6d6
| 346086 ||  || — || October 16, 2007 || Mount Lemmon || Mount Lemmon Survey || — || align=right | 2.4 km || 
|-id=087 bgcolor=#d6d6d6
| 346087 ||  || — || October 17, 2007 || Mount Lemmon || Mount Lemmon Survey || — || align=right | 3.8 km || 
|-id=088 bgcolor=#d6d6d6
| 346088 ||  || — || October 21, 2007 || Mount Lemmon || Mount Lemmon Survey || — || align=right | 3.5 km || 
|-id=089 bgcolor=#d6d6d6
| 346089 ||  || — || November 4, 2007 || Junk Bond || D. Healy || — || align=right | 2.1 km || 
|-id=090 bgcolor=#d6d6d6
| 346090 ||  || — || November 2, 2007 || Mount Lemmon || Mount Lemmon Survey || KOR || align=right | 1.1 km || 
|-id=091 bgcolor=#d6d6d6
| 346091 ||  || — || November 2, 2007 || Kitt Peak || Spacewatch || — || align=right | 2.6 km || 
|-id=092 bgcolor=#d6d6d6
| 346092 ||  || — || November 2, 2007 || Kitt Peak || Spacewatch || CHA || align=right | 1.7 km || 
|-id=093 bgcolor=#d6d6d6
| 346093 ||  || — || November 2, 2007 || Kitt Peak || Spacewatch || IMH || align=right | 2.8 km || 
|-id=094 bgcolor=#d6d6d6
| 346094 ||  || — || November 2, 2007 || Kitt Peak || Spacewatch || — || align=right | 4.1 km || 
|-id=095 bgcolor=#d6d6d6
| 346095 ||  || — || November 1, 2007 || Kitt Peak || Spacewatch || KOR || align=right | 1.3 km || 
|-id=096 bgcolor=#d6d6d6
| 346096 ||  || — || November 1, 2007 || Kitt Peak || Spacewatch || TIR || align=right | 4.6 km || 
|-id=097 bgcolor=#d6d6d6
| 346097 ||  || — || November 1, 2007 || Kitt Peak || Spacewatch || CHA || align=right | 2.2 km || 
|-id=098 bgcolor=#d6d6d6
| 346098 ||  || — || November 1, 2007 || Kitt Peak || Spacewatch || — || align=right | 3.3 km || 
|-id=099 bgcolor=#d6d6d6
| 346099 ||  || — || November 1, 2007 || Kitt Peak || Spacewatch || URS || align=right | 3.6 km || 
|-id=100 bgcolor=#d6d6d6
| 346100 ||  || — || November 1, 2007 || Kitt Peak || Spacewatch || — || align=right | 2.1 km || 
|}

346101–346200 

|-bgcolor=#d6d6d6
| 346101 ||  || — || November 1, 2007 || Kitt Peak || Spacewatch || ALA || align=right | 4.8 km || 
|-id=102 bgcolor=#d6d6d6
| 346102 ||  || — || November 1, 2007 || Kitt Peak || Spacewatch || — || align=right | 3.1 km || 
|-id=103 bgcolor=#E9E9E9
| 346103 ||  || — || November 1, 2007 || Kitt Peak || Spacewatch || — || align=right | 3.3 km || 
|-id=104 bgcolor=#d6d6d6
| 346104 ||  || — || November 1, 2007 || Kitt Peak || Spacewatch || — || align=right | 2.6 km || 
|-id=105 bgcolor=#E9E9E9
| 346105 ||  || — || November 2, 2007 || Catalina || CSS || — || align=right | 2.5 km || 
|-id=106 bgcolor=#d6d6d6
| 346106 ||  || — || November 3, 2007 || Kitt Peak || Spacewatch || THM || align=right | 2.2 km || 
|-id=107 bgcolor=#d6d6d6
| 346107 ||  || — || November 3, 2007 || Kitt Peak || Spacewatch || — || align=right | 2.5 km || 
|-id=108 bgcolor=#E9E9E9
| 346108 ||  || — || November 2, 2007 || Socorro || LINEAR || — || align=right | 2.8 km || 
|-id=109 bgcolor=#d6d6d6
| 346109 ||  || — || November 2, 2007 || Socorro || LINEAR || — || align=right | 4.2 km || 
|-id=110 bgcolor=#d6d6d6
| 346110 ||  || — || November 7, 2007 || Eskridge || G. Hug || — || align=right | 6.4 km || 
|-id=111 bgcolor=#d6d6d6
| 346111 ||  || — || November 3, 2007 || Socorro || LINEAR || — || align=right | 3.5 km || 
|-id=112 bgcolor=#d6d6d6
| 346112 ||  || — || November 7, 2007 || Bisei SG Center || BATTeRS || — || align=right | 4.8 km || 
|-id=113 bgcolor=#d6d6d6
| 346113 ||  || — || November 1, 2007 || Kitt Peak || Spacewatch || CHA || align=right | 2.4 km || 
|-id=114 bgcolor=#d6d6d6
| 346114 ||  || — || November 2, 2007 || Kitt Peak || Spacewatch || — || align=right | 3.5 km || 
|-id=115 bgcolor=#E9E9E9
| 346115 ||  || — || November 3, 2007 || Kitt Peak || Spacewatch || HEN || align=right | 1.2 km || 
|-id=116 bgcolor=#d6d6d6
| 346116 ||  || — || November 3, 2007 || Kitt Peak || Spacewatch || HYG || align=right | 2.6 km || 
|-id=117 bgcolor=#d6d6d6
| 346117 ||  || — || November 1, 2007 || Mount Lemmon || Mount Lemmon Survey || KOR || align=right | 1.5 km || 
|-id=118 bgcolor=#d6d6d6
| 346118 ||  || — || November 2, 2007 || Mount Lemmon || Mount Lemmon Survey || — || align=right | 1.9 km || 
|-id=119 bgcolor=#E9E9E9
| 346119 ||  || — || November 3, 2007 || Kitt Peak || Spacewatch || — || align=right | 2.8 km || 
|-id=120 bgcolor=#d6d6d6
| 346120 ||  || — || November 4, 2007 || Kitt Peak || Spacewatch || KOR || align=right | 1.5 km || 
|-id=121 bgcolor=#d6d6d6
| 346121 ||  || — || November 7, 2007 || Kitt Peak || Spacewatch || — || align=right | 3.3 km || 
|-id=122 bgcolor=#d6d6d6
| 346122 ||  || — || November 5, 2007 || Kitt Peak || Spacewatch || EOS || align=right | 1.6 km || 
|-id=123 bgcolor=#E9E9E9
| 346123 ||  || — || November 5, 2007 || Mount Lemmon || Mount Lemmon Survey || — || align=right | 2.1 km || 
|-id=124 bgcolor=#d6d6d6
| 346124 ||  || — || November 5, 2007 || Kitt Peak || Spacewatch || — || align=right | 3.2 km || 
|-id=125 bgcolor=#d6d6d6
| 346125 ||  || — || November 5, 2007 || Mount Lemmon || Mount Lemmon Survey || FIR || align=right | 5.1 km || 
|-id=126 bgcolor=#d6d6d6
| 346126 ||  || — || November 5, 2007 || Kitt Peak || Spacewatch || — || align=right | 3.9 km || 
|-id=127 bgcolor=#d6d6d6
| 346127 ||  || — || November 5, 2007 || Kitt Peak || Spacewatch || — || align=right | 4.1 km || 
|-id=128 bgcolor=#d6d6d6
| 346128 ||  || — || November 7, 2007 || Kitt Peak || Spacewatch || — || align=right | 2.3 km || 
|-id=129 bgcolor=#d6d6d6
| 346129 ||  || — || November 2, 2007 || Catalina || CSS || — || align=right | 4.3 km || 
|-id=130 bgcolor=#d6d6d6
| 346130 ||  || — || November 3, 2007 || Anderson Mesa || LONEOS || — || align=right | 2.6 km || 
|-id=131 bgcolor=#d6d6d6
| 346131 ||  || — || November 4, 2007 || Mount Lemmon || Mount Lemmon Survey || — || align=right | 3.7 km || 
|-id=132 bgcolor=#d6d6d6
| 346132 ||  || — || November 5, 2007 || Mount Lemmon || Mount Lemmon Survey || EOS || align=right | 2.7 km || 
|-id=133 bgcolor=#d6d6d6
| 346133 ||  || — || November 7, 2007 || Catalina || CSS || BRA || align=right | 1.8 km || 
|-id=134 bgcolor=#d6d6d6
| 346134 ||  || — || November 8, 2007 || Mount Lemmon || Mount Lemmon Survey || — || align=right | 2.5 km || 
|-id=135 bgcolor=#d6d6d6
| 346135 ||  || — || November 5, 2007 || Purple Mountain || PMO NEO || — || align=right | 3.6 km || 
|-id=136 bgcolor=#d6d6d6
| 346136 ||  || — || October 12, 2007 || Kitt Peak || Spacewatch || K-2 || align=right | 1.3 km || 
|-id=137 bgcolor=#d6d6d6
| 346137 ||  || — || November 9, 2007 || Kitt Peak || Spacewatch || — || align=right | 2.8 km || 
|-id=138 bgcolor=#d6d6d6
| 346138 ||  || — || November 7, 2007 || Mount Lemmon || Mount Lemmon Survey || — || align=right | 2.0 km || 
|-id=139 bgcolor=#E9E9E9
| 346139 ||  || — || November 9, 2007 || Mount Lemmon || Mount Lemmon Survey || HOF || align=right | 3.4 km || 
|-id=140 bgcolor=#d6d6d6
| 346140 ||  || — || November 9, 2007 || Mount Lemmon || Mount Lemmon Survey || — || align=right | 1.9 km || 
|-id=141 bgcolor=#d6d6d6
| 346141 ||  || — || November 9, 2007 || Mount Lemmon || Mount Lemmon Survey || NAE || align=right | 3.3 km || 
|-id=142 bgcolor=#d6d6d6
| 346142 ||  || — || November 7, 2007 || Kitt Peak || Spacewatch || KOR || align=right | 1.4 km || 
|-id=143 bgcolor=#d6d6d6
| 346143 ||  || — || November 9, 2007 || Kitt Peak || Spacewatch || — || align=right | 3.0 km || 
|-id=144 bgcolor=#d6d6d6
| 346144 ||  || — || November 11, 2007 || Mount Lemmon || Mount Lemmon Survey || CHA || align=right | 2.4 km || 
|-id=145 bgcolor=#d6d6d6
| 346145 ||  || — || November 11, 2007 || Mount Lemmon || Mount Lemmon Survey || URS || align=right | 4.1 km || 
|-id=146 bgcolor=#d6d6d6
| 346146 ||  || — || November 13, 2007 || Kitt Peak || Spacewatch || — || align=right | 2.8 km || 
|-id=147 bgcolor=#E9E9E9
| 346147 ||  || — || April 7, 2005 || Anderson Mesa || LONEOS || HNS || align=right | 1.8 km || 
|-id=148 bgcolor=#d6d6d6
| 346148 ||  || — || November 11, 2007 || Purple Mountain || PMO NEO || — || align=right | 4.4 km || 
|-id=149 bgcolor=#fefefe
| 346149 ||  || — || November 9, 2007 || Catalina || CSS || H || align=right data-sort-value="0.75" | 750 m || 
|-id=150 bgcolor=#d6d6d6
| 346150 Nanyi ||  ||  || November 5, 2007 || XuYi || PMO NEO || EOS || align=right | 2.3 km || 
|-id=151 bgcolor=#d6d6d6
| 346151 ||  || — || November 13, 2007 || Mount Lemmon || Mount Lemmon Survey || URS || align=right | 4.2 km || 
|-id=152 bgcolor=#d6d6d6
| 346152 ||  || — || November 14, 2007 || Kitt Peak || Spacewatch || — || align=right | 6.4 km || 
|-id=153 bgcolor=#E9E9E9
| 346153 ||  || — || November 15, 2007 || Anderson Mesa || LONEOS || — || align=right | 2.4 km || 
|-id=154 bgcolor=#d6d6d6
| 346154 ||  || — || November 13, 2007 || Kitt Peak || Spacewatch || — || align=right | 2.9 km || 
|-id=155 bgcolor=#d6d6d6
| 346155 ||  || — || November 14, 2007 || Kitt Peak || Spacewatch || — || align=right | 3.0 km || 
|-id=156 bgcolor=#d6d6d6
| 346156 ||  || — || November 14, 2007 || Kitt Peak || Spacewatch || — || align=right | 3.3 km || 
|-id=157 bgcolor=#d6d6d6
| 346157 ||  || — || November 14, 2007 || Kitt Peak || Spacewatch || — || align=right | 2.5 km || 
|-id=158 bgcolor=#d6d6d6
| 346158 ||  || — || November 14, 2007 || Kitt Peak || Spacewatch || EOS || align=right | 2.1 km || 
|-id=159 bgcolor=#d6d6d6
| 346159 ||  || — || November 14, 2007 || Kitt Peak || Spacewatch || THM || align=right | 2.6 km || 
|-id=160 bgcolor=#d6d6d6
| 346160 ||  || — || November 14, 2007 || Kitt Peak || Spacewatch || — || align=right | 2.3 km || 
|-id=161 bgcolor=#d6d6d6
| 346161 ||  || — || November 11, 2007 || Catalina || CSS || URS || align=right | 3.7 km || 
|-id=162 bgcolor=#E9E9E9
| 346162 ||  || — || November 2, 2007 || Catalina || CSS || — || align=right | 3.0 km || 
|-id=163 bgcolor=#d6d6d6
| 346163 ||  || — || November 5, 2007 || Kitt Peak || Spacewatch || THM || align=right | 2.3 km || 
|-id=164 bgcolor=#d6d6d6
| 346164 ||  || — || November 9, 2007 || Kitt Peak || Spacewatch || — || align=right | 5.6 km || 
|-id=165 bgcolor=#d6d6d6
| 346165 ||  || — || November 9, 2007 || Mount Lemmon || Mount Lemmon Survey || 615 || align=right | 1.3 km || 
|-id=166 bgcolor=#d6d6d6
| 346166 ||  || — || November 3, 2007 || Mount Lemmon || Mount Lemmon Survey || — || align=right | 3.9 km || 
|-id=167 bgcolor=#d6d6d6
| 346167 ||  || — || November 1, 2007 || Kitt Peak || Spacewatch || — || align=right | 3.2 km || 
|-id=168 bgcolor=#d6d6d6
| 346168 ||  || — || November 5, 2007 || Mount Lemmon || Mount Lemmon Survey || THM || align=right | 2.2 km || 
|-id=169 bgcolor=#d6d6d6
| 346169 ||  || — || September 13, 2007 || Mount Lemmon || Mount Lemmon Survey || EOS || align=right | 2.2 km || 
|-id=170 bgcolor=#d6d6d6
| 346170 ||  || — || September 29, 2001 || Palomar || NEAT || — || align=right | 3.5 km || 
|-id=171 bgcolor=#d6d6d6
| 346171 ||  || — || November 1, 2007 || Kitt Peak || Spacewatch || — || align=right | 3.7 km || 
|-id=172 bgcolor=#fefefe
| 346172 ||  || — || November 4, 2007 || Mount Lemmon || Mount Lemmon Survey || — || align=right | 1.7 km || 
|-id=173 bgcolor=#d6d6d6
| 346173 ||  || — || November 7, 2007 || Kitt Peak || Spacewatch || — || align=right | 2.4 km || 
|-id=174 bgcolor=#E9E9E9
| 346174 ||  || — || November 13, 2007 || Kitt Peak || Spacewatch || — || align=right | 2.7 km || 
|-id=175 bgcolor=#d6d6d6
| 346175 ||  || — || November 14, 2007 || Kitt Peak || Spacewatch || VER || align=right | 3.5 km || 
|-id=176 bgcolor=#d6d6d6
| 346176 ||  || — || November 17, 2007 || Bisei SG Center || BATTeRS || — || align=right | 2.8 km || 
|-id=177 bgcolor=#d6d6d6
| 346177 ||  || — || November 18, 2007 || Socorro || LINEAR || — || align=right | 3.1 km || 
|-id=178 bgcolor=#d6d6d6
| 346178 ||  || — || November 18, 2007 || Mount Lemmon || Mount Lemmon Survey || — || align=right | 4.0 km || 
|-id=179 bgcolor=#d6d6d6
| 346179 ||  || — || November 17, 2007 || Kitt Peak || Spacewatch || CHA || align=right | 2.3 km || 
|-id=180 bgcolor=#d6d6d6
| 346180 ||  || — || November 2, 2007 || Kitt Peak || Spacewatch || — || align=right | 3.0 km || 
|-id=181 bgcolor=#d6d6d6
| 346181 ||  || — || November 19, 2007 || Mount Lemmon || Mount Lemmon Survey || — || align=right | 3.9 km || 
|-id=182 bgcolor=#d6d6d6
| 346182 ||  || — || November 17, 2007 || Catalina || CSS || — || align=right | 3.1 km || 
|-id=183 bgcolor=#d6d6d6
| 346183 ||  || — || November 18, 2007 || Mount Lemmon || Mount Lemmon Survey || — || align=right | 3.3 km || 
|-id=184 bgcolor=#d6d6d6
| 346184 ||  || — || November 30, 2007 || Antares || ARO || THM || align=right | 2.5 km || 
|-id=185 bgcolor=#d6d6d6
| 346185 ||  || — || November 30, 2007 || Lulin Observatory || T.-C. Yang, Q.-z. Ye || — || align=right | 5.1 km || 
|-id=186 bgcolor=#d6d6d6
| 346186 ||  || — || November 20, 2007 || Mount Lemmon || Mount Lemmon Survey || — || align=right | 2.9 km || 
|-id=187 bgcolor=#d6d6d6
| 346187 ||  || — || November 21, 2007 || Mount Lemmon || Mount Lemmon Survey || — || align=right | 3.2 km || 
|-id=188 bgcolor=#d6d6d6
| 346188 ||  || — || November 4, 2007 || Mount Lemmon || Mount Lemmon Survey || EOS || align=right | 2.5 km || 
|-id=189 bgcolor=#d6d6d6
| 346189 ||  || — || December 3, 2007 || Catalina || CSS || — || align=right | 4.1 km || 
|-id=190 bgcolor=#d6d6d6
| 346190 ||  || — || December 4, 2007 || Anderson Mesa || LONEOS || URS || align=right | 5.1 km || 
|-id=191 bgcolor=#d6d6d6
| 346191 ||  || — || December 4, 2007 || Kitt Peak || Spacewatch || — || align=right | 4.6 km || 
|-id=192 bgcolor=#d6d6d6
| 346192 ||  || — || October 14, 2007 || Mount Lemmon || Mount Lemmon Survey || — || align=right | 3.2 km || 
|-id=193 bgcolor=#d6d6d6
| 346193 ||  || — || December 12, 2007 || La Sagra || OAM Obs. || — || align=right | 2.8 km || 
|-id=194 bgcolor=#fefefe
| 346194 ||  || — || December 13, 2007 || Socorro || LINEAR || H || align=right data-sort-value="0.94" | 940 m || 
|-id=195 bgcolor=#d6d6d6
| 346195 ||  || — || December 14, 2007 || Dauban || Chante-Perdrix Obs. || — || align=right | 3.0 km || 
|-id=196 bgcolor=#fefefe
| 346196 ||  || — || December 13, 2007 || Socorro || LINEAR || H || align=right data-sort-value="0.74" | 740 m || 
|-id=197 bgcolor=#d6d6d6
| 346197 ||  || — || December 15, 2007 || La Sagra || OAM Obs. || — || align=right | 3.1 km || 
|-id=198 bgcolor=#d6d6d6
| 346198 ||  || — || December 15, 2007 || La Sagra || OAM Obs. || — || align=right | 4.5 km || 
|-id=199 bgcolor=#d6d6d6
| 346199 ||  || — || December 14, 2007 || Kitt Peak || Spacewatch || — || align=right | 5.3 km || 
|-id=200 bgcolor=#d6d6d6
| 346200 ||  || — || December 15, 2007 || Kitt Peak || Spacewatch || — || align=right | 2.4 km || 
|}

346201–346300 

|-bgcolor=#d6d6d6
| 346201 ||  || — || December 15, 2007 || Kitt Peak || Spacewatch || — || align=right | 3.4 km || 
|-id=202 bgcolor=#d6d6d6
| 346202 ||  || — || December 10, 2007 || Socorro || LINEAR || — || align=right | 3.7 km || 
|-id=203 bgcolor=#d6d6d6
| 346203 ||  || — || December 13, 2007 || Socorro || LINEAR || — || align=right | 4.8 km || 
|-id=204 bgcolor=#d6d6d6
| 346204 ||  || — || December 15, 2007 || Kitt Peak || Spacewatch || ELF || align=right | 4.3 km || 
|-id=205 bgcolor=#d6d6d6
| 346205 ||  || — || December 15, 2007 || Kitt Peak || Spacewatch || — || align=right | 3.6 km || 
|-id=206 bgcolor=#d6d6d6
| 346206 ||  || — || December 4, 2007 || Mount Lemmon || Mount Lemmon Survey || — || align=right | 3.4 km || 
|-id=207 bgcolor=#d6d6d6
| 346207 ||  || — || December 5, 2007 || Kitt Peak || Spacewatch || — || align=right | 5.4 km || 
|-id=208 bgcolor=#d6d6d6
| 346208 ||  || — || December 5, 2007 || Kitt Peak || Spacewatch || EOS || align=right | 2.3 km || 
|-id=209 bgcolor=#d6d6d6
| 346209 ||  || — || December 14, 2007 || Mount Lemmon || Mount Lemmon Survey || — || align=right | 2.9 km || 
|-id=210 bgcolor=#d6d6d6
| 346210 ||  || — || December 16, 2007 || Mount Lemmon || Mount Lemmon Survey || — || align=right | 4.1 km || 
|-id=211 bgcolor=#d6d6d6
| 346211 ||  || — || December 16, 2007 || Kitt Peak || Spacewatch || — || align=right | 2.7 km || 
|-id=212 bgcolor=#fefefe
| 346212 ||  || — || November 4, 2007 || Kitt Peak || Spacewatch || H || align=right data-sort-value="0.72" | 720 m || 
|-id=213 bgcolor=#d6d6d6
| 346213 ||  || — || December 16, 2007 || Mount Lemmon || Mount Lemmon Survey || — || align=right | 3.5 km || 
|-id=214 bgcolor=#d6d6d6
| 346214 ||  || — || December 18, 2007 || Mount Lemmon || Mount Lemmon Survey || — || align=right | 2.7 km || 
|-id=215 bgcolor=#d6d6d6
| 346215 ||  || — || December 28, 2007 || Kitt Peak || Spacewatch || — || align=right | 4.8 km || 
|-id=216 bgcolor=#fefefe
| 346216 ||  || — || December 30, 2007 || Mount Lemmon || Mount Lemmon Survey || H || align=right data-sort-value="0.92" | 920 m || 
|-id=217 bgcolor=#fefefe
| 346217 ||  || — || December 30, 2007 || La Sagra || OAM Obs. || H || align=right | 1.0 km || 
|-id=218 bgcolor=#d6d6d6
| 346218 ||  || — || December 28, 2007 || Kitt Peak || Spacewatch || THM || align=right | 2.3 km || 
|-id=219 bgcolor=#d6d6d6
| 346219 ||  || — || December 29, 2007 || Lulin Observatory || LUSS || — || align=right | 4.1 km || 
|-id=220 bgcolor=#d6d6d6
| 346220 ||  || — || December 5, 2007 || Kitt Peak || Spacewatch || — || align=right | 3.9 km || 
|-id=221 bgcolor=#d6d6d6
| 346221 ||  || — || December 31, 2007 || Catalina || CSS || — || align=right | 3.7 km || 
|-id=222 bgcolor=#fefefe
| 346222 ||  || — || December 18, 2007 || Mount Lemmon || Mount Lemmon Survey || H || align=right | 1.0 km || 
|-id=223 bgcolor=#d6d6d6
| 346223 ||  || — || December 16, 2007 || Catalina || CSS || — || align=right | 3.5 km || 
|-id=224 bgcolor=#d6d6d6
| 346224 ||  || — || December 16, 2007 || Kitt Peak || Spacewatch || — || align=right | 2.5 km || 
|-id=225 bgcolor=#d6d6d6
| 346225 ||  || — || December 30, 2007 || Mount Lemmon || Mount Lemmon Survey || — || align=right | 2.4 km || 
|-id=226 bgcolor=#d6d6d6
| 346226 ||  || — || December 20, 2007 || Kitt Peak || Spacewatch || HYG || align=right | 2.9 km || 
|-id=227 bgcolor=#d6d6d6
| 346227 ||  || — || January 8, 2008 || Altschwendt || W. Ries || EOS || align=right | 2.6 km || 
|-id=228 bgcolor=#d6d6d6
| 346228 ||  || — || January 10, 2008 || Mount Lemmon || Mount Lemmon Survey || EOS || align=right | 2.3 km || 
|-id=229 bgcolor=#d6d6d6
| 346229 ||  || — || January 10, 2008 || Mount Lemmon || Mount Lemmon Survey || — || align=right | 2.5 km || 
|-id=230 bgcolor=#d6d6d6
| 346230 ||  || — || January 10, 2008 || Kitt Peak || Spacewatch || — || align=right | 2.9 km || 
|-id=231 bgcolor=#d6d6d6
| 346231 ||  || — || January 10, 2008 || Catalina || CSS || — || align=right | 4.6 km || 
|-id=232 bgcolor=#d6d6d6
| 346232 ||  || — || January 10, 2008 || Kitt Peak || Spacewatch || HYG || align=right | 2.6 km || 
|-id=233 bgcolor=#d6d6d6
| 346233 ||  || — || January 10, 2008 || Mount Lemmon || Mount Lemmon Survey || — || align=right | 2.4 km || 
|-id=234 bgcolor=#d6d6d6
| 346234 ||  || — || January 11, 2008 || Catalina || CSS || VER || align=right | 3.6 km || 
|-id=235 bgcolor=#d6d6d6
| 346235 ||  || — || January 13, 2008 || Catalina || CSS || — || align=right | 2.9 km || 
|-id=236 bgcolor=#d6d6d6
| 346236 ||  || — || January 16, 2008 || Kitt Peak || Spacewatch || 7:4 || align=right | 4.1 km || 
|-id=237 bgcolor=#d6d6d6
| 346237 ||  || — || January 30, 2008 || Catalina || CSS || — || align=right | 6.0 km || 
|-id=238 bgcolor=#d6d6d6
| 346238 ||  || — || January 30, 2008 || Catalina || CSS || — || align=right | 2.9 km || 
|-id=239 bgcolor=#E9E9E9
| 346239 ||  || — || January 31, 2008 || Socorro || LINEAR || DOR || align=right | 3.2 km || 
|-id=240 bgcolor=#d6d6d6
| 346240 ||  || — || January 16, 2008 || Mount Lemmon || Mount Lemmon Survey || Tj (2.98) || align=right | 4.4 km || 
|-id=241 bgcolor=#d6d6d6
| 346241 ||  || — || January 16, 2008 || Mayhill || A. Lowe || — || align=right | 3.9 km || 
|-id=242 bgcolor=#d6d6d6
| 346242 ||  || — || January 31, 2008 || Catalina || CSS || — || align=right | 3.2 km || 
|-id=243 bgcolor=#d6d6d6
| 346243 ||  || — || February 6, 2008 || Catalina || CSS || — || align=right | 3.3 km || 
|-id=244 bgcolor=#d6d6d6
| 346244 ||  || — || February 6, 2008 || Anderson Mesa || LONEOS || — || align=right | 3.9 km || 
|-id=245 bgcolor=#C2FFFF
| 346245 ||  || — || February 10, 2008 || Mount Lemmon || Mount Lemmon Survey || L5 || align=right | 10 km || 
|-id=246 bgcolor=#d6d6d6
| 346246 ||  || — || February 9, 2008 || Socorro || LINEAR || MEL || align=right | 5.3 km || 
|-id=247 bgcolor=#d6d6d6
| 346247 ||  || — || February 9, 2008 || Anderson Mesa || LONEOS || ALA || align=right | 5.1 km || 
|-id=248 bgcolor=#fefefe
| 346248 ||  || — || November 9, 2007 || Mount Lemmon || Mount Lemmon Survey || H || align=right data-sort-value="0.96" | 960 m || 
|-id=249 bgcolor=#fefefe
| 346249 ||  || — || February 27, 2008 || Lulin || LUSS || H || align=right data-sort-value="0.87" | 870 m || 
|-id=250 bgcolor=#E9E9E9
| 346250 ||  || — || February 27, 2008 || Mount Lemmon || Mount Lemmon Survey || — || align=right | 2.8 km || 
|-id=251 bgcolor=#d6d6d6
| 346251 ||  || — || February 28, 2008 || Catalina || CSS || TIR || align=right | 3.9 km || 
|-id=252 bgcolor=#d6d6d6
| 346252 ||  || — || February 28, 2008 || Catalina || CSS || TIR || align=right | 3.5 km || 
|-id=253 bgcolor=#d6d6d6
| 346253 ||  || — || February 26, 2008 || Kitt Peak || Spacewatch || — || align=right | 3.4 km || 
|-id=254 bgcolor=#d6d6d6
| 346254 ||  || — || March 3, 2008 || Mount Lemmon || Mount Lemmon Survey || — || align=right | 3.5 km || 
|-id=255 bgcolor=#C2FFFF
| 346255 ||  || — || March 4, 2008 || Mount Lemmon || Mount Lemmon Survey || L5 || align=right | 13 km || 
|-id=256 bgcolor=#d6d6d6
| 346256 ||  || — || March 1, 2008 || Catalina || CSS || — || align=right | 6.4 km || 
|-id=257 bgcolor=#fefefe
| 346257 ||  || — || March 9, 2008 || Mount Lemmon || Mount Lemmon Survey || H || align=right data-sort-value="0.99" | 990 m || 
|-id=258 bgcolor=#fefefe
| 346258 ||  || — || March 6, 2008 || Mount Lemmon || Mount Lemmon Survey || — || align=right data-sort-value="0.93" | 930 m || 
|-id=259 bgcolor=#d6d6d6
| 346259 ||  || — || March 1, 2008 || Socorro || LINEAR || — || align=right | 2.8 km || 
|-id=260 bgcolor=#d6d6d6
| 346260 ||  || — || March 11, 2008 || Kitt Peak || Spacewatch || 3:2 || align=right | 4.3 km || 
|-id=261 bgcolor=#fefefe
| 346261 Alexandrescu ||  ||  || March 12, 2008 || La Silla || EURONEAR || — || align=right data-sort-value="0.75" | 750 m || 
|-id=262 bgcolor=#d6d6d6
| 346262 ||  || — || March 26, 2008 || Kitt Peak || Spacewatch || — || align=right | 5.6 km || 
|-id=263 bgcolor=#d6d6d6
| 346263 ||  || — || March 28, 2008 || Kitt Peak || Spacewatch || SHU3:2 || align=right | 6.5 km || 
|-id=264 bgcolor=#C2FFFF
| 346264 ||  || — || March 30, 2008 || Kitt Peak || Spacewatch || L5 || align=right | 9.3 km || 
|-id=265 bgcolor=#d6d6d6
| 346265 ||  || — || March 31, 2008 || Kitt Peak || Spacewatch || 3:2 || align=right | 4.1 km || 
|-id=266 bgcolor=#fefefe
| 346266 ||  || — || March 31, 2008 || Kitt Peak || Spacewatch || — || align=right data-sort-value="0.86" | 860 m || 
|-id=267 bgcolor=#C2FFFF
| 346267 ||  || — || March 28, 2008 || Kitt Peak || Spacewatch || L5 || align=right | 13 km || 
|-id=268 bgcolor=#C2FFFF
| 346268 ||  || — || March 28, 2008 || Kitt Peak || Spacewatch || L5 || align=right | 9.3 km || 
|-id=269 bgcolor=#fefefe
| 346269 ||  || — || April 3, 2008 || Mount Lemmon || Mount Lemmon Survey || — || align=right data-sort-value="0.80" | 800 m || 
|-id=270 bgcolor=#fefefe
| 346270 ||  || — || April 4, 2008 || Kitt Peak || Spacewatch || V || align=right data-sort-value="0.63" | 630 m || 
|-id=271 bgcolor=#fefefe
| 346271 ||  || — || March 4, 2008 || Mount Lemmon || Mount Lemmon Survey || — || align=right data-sort-value="0.56" | 560 m || 
|-id=272 bgcolor=#fefefe
| 346272 ||  || — || April 7, 2008 || Kitt Peak || Spacewatch || — || align=right data-sort-value="0.68" | 680 m || 
|-id=273 bgcolor=#fefefe
| 346273 ||  || — || April 8, 2008 || Kitt Peak || Spacewatch || — || align=right data-sort-value="0.68" | 680 m || 
|-id=274 bgcolor=#C2FFFF
| 346274 ||  || — || March 28, 2008 || Mount Lemmon || Mount Lemmon Survey || L5 || align=right | 7.4 km || 
|-id=275 bgcolor=#fefefe
| 346275 ||  || — || April 7, 2008 || Kitt Peak || Spacewatch || FLO || align=right data-sort-value="0.65" | 650 m || 
|-id=276 bgcolor=#fefefe
| 346276 ||  || — || May 19, 2005 || Palomar || NEAT || — || align=right data-sort-value="0.76" | 760 m || 
|-id=277 bgcolor=#fefefe
| 346277 ||  || — || April 6, 2008 || Mount Lemmon || Mount Lemmon Survey || NYS || align=right data-sort-value="0.66" | 660 m || 
|-id=278 bgcolor=#C2FFFF
| 346278 ||  || — || March 19, 2007 || Mount Lemmon || Mount Lemmon Survey || L5 || align=right | 11 km || 
|-id=279 bgcolor=#fefefe
| 346279 ||  || — || April 24, 2008 || Kitt Peak || Spacewatch || — || align=right data-sort-value="0.53" | 530 m || 
|-id=280 bgcolor=#fefefe
| 346280 ||  || — || April 29, 2008 || Mount Lemmon || Mount Lemmon Survey || — || align=right data-sort-value="0.83" | 830 m || 
|-id=281 bgcolor=#FA8072
| 346281 ||  || — || May 2, 2008 || Catalina || CSS || — || align=right data-sort-value="0.85" | 850 m || 
|-id=282 bgcolor=#d6d6d6
| 346282 ||  || — || May 12, 2008 || Mount Lemmon || Mount Lemmon Survey || — || align=right | 6.1 km || 
|-id=283 bgcolor=#fefefe
| 346283 ||  || — || May 7, 2008 || Kitt Peak || Spacewatch || — || align=right data-sort-value="0.61" | 610 m || 
|-id=284 bgcolor=#fefefe
| 346284 ||  || — || May 3, 2008 || Mount Lemmon || Mount Lemmon Survey || — || align=right data-sort-value="0.65" | 650 m || 
|-id=285 bgcolor=#fefefe
| 346285 ||  || — || May 28, 2008 || Mount Lemmon || Mount Lemmon Survey || — || align=right data-sort-value="0.60" | 600 m || 
|-id=286 bgcolor=#fefefe
| 346286 ||  || — || May 30, 2008 || Kitt Peak || Spacewatch || — || align=right data-sort-value="0.94" | 940 m || 
|-id=287 bgcolor=#fefefe
| 346287 ||  || — || November 20, 2006 || Kitt Peak || Spacewatch || — || align=right data-sort-value="0.71" | 710 m || 
|-id=288 bgcolor=#fefefe
| 346288 ||  || — || July 9, 2008 || La Sagra || OAM Obs. || — || align=right data-sort-value="0.98" | 980 m || 
|-id=289 bgcolor=#fefefe
| 346289 ||  || — || July 14, 2008 || Charleston || ARO || — || align=right data-sort-value="0.88" | 880 m || 
|-id=290 bgcolor=#fefefe
| 346290 ||  || — || July 28, 2008 || Hibiscus || S. F. Hönig, N. Teamo || — || align=right | 1.0 km || 
|-id=291 bgcolor=#fefefe
| 346291 ||  || — || July 29, 2008 || Kitt Peak || Spacewatch || NYS || align=right data-sort-value="0.75" | 750 m || 
|-id=292 bgcolor=#fefefe
| 346292 ||  || — || July 30, 2008 || Kitt Peak || Spacewatch || — || align=right data-sort-value="0.98" | 980 m || 
|-id=293 bgcolor=#fefefe
| 346293 ||  || — || August 4, 2008 || Vicques || M. Ory || — || align=right | 1.1 km || 
|-id=294 bgcolor=#fefefe
| 346294 ||  || — || September 21, 2001 || Kitt Peak || Spacewatch || MAS || align=right data-sort-value="0.68" | 680 m || 
|-id=295 bgcolor=#fefefe
| 346295 ||  || — || August 5, 2008 || La Sagra || OAM Obs. || — || align=right data-sort-value="0.88" | 880 m || 
|-id=296 bgcolor=#fefefe
| 346296 ||  || — || August 6, 2008 || Dauban || F. Kugel || ERI || align=right | 1.3 km || 
|-id=297 bgcolor=#E9E9E9
| 346297 ||  || — || August 8, 2008 || La Sagra || OAM Obs. || HNS || align=right | 1.6 km || 
|-id=298 bgcolor=#fefefe
| 346298 ||  || — || August 10, 2008 || La Sagra || OAM Obs. || MAS || align=right data-sort-value="0.59" | 590 m || 
|-id=299 bgcolor=#E9E9E9
| 346299 ||  || — || August 7, 2008 || Kitt Peak || Spacewatch || MIS || align=right | 2.9 km || 
|-id=300 bgcolor=#fefefe
| 346300 ||  || — || August 20, 2008 || Hibiscus || N. Teamo || V || align=right data-sort-value="0.76" | 760 m || 
|}

346301–346400 

|-bgcolor=#fefefe
| 346301 ||  || — || August 24, 2008 || La Sagra || OAM Obs. || — || align=right | 1.0 km || 
|-id=302 bgcolor=#fefefe
| 346302 ||  || — || August 25, 2008 || Piszkéstető || K. Sárneczky || MAS || align=right data-sort-value="0.86" | 860 m || 
|-id=303 bgcolor=#fefefe
| 346303 ||  || — || August 25, 2008 || Pises || Pises Obs. || MAS || align=right data-sort-value="0.75" | 750 m || 
|-id=304 bgcolor=#fefefe
| 346304 ||  || — || August 26, 2008 || La Sagra || OAM Obs. || MAS || align=right data-sort-value="0.73" | 730 m || 
|-id=305 bgcolor=#fefefe
| 346305 ||  || — || August 26, 2008 || Dauban || F. Kugel || MAS || align=right data-sort-value="0.80" | 800 m || 
|-id=306 bgcolor=#fefefe
| 346306 ||  || — || August 26, 2008 || La Sagra || OAM Obs. || NYS || align=right data-sort-value="0.71" | 710 m || 
|-id=307 bgcolor=#E9E9E9
| 346307 ||  || — || August 26, 2008 || La Sagra || OAM Obs. || PAD || align=right | 1.8 km || 
|-id=308 bgcolor=#fefefe
| 346308 ||  || — || August 26, 2008 || La Sagra || OAM Obs. || NYS || align=right data-sort-value="0.73" | 730 m || 
|-id=309 bgcolor=#fefefe
| 346309 ||  || — || August 26, 2008 || La Sagra || OAM Obs. || — || align=right | 1.3 km || 
|-id=310 bgcolor=#fefefe
| 346310 ||  || — || August 7, 2008 || Kitt Peak || Spacewatch || MAS || align=right data-sort-value="0.71" | 710 m || 
|-id=311 bgcolor=#fefefe
| 346311 ||  || — || August 27, 2008 || La Sagra || OAM Obs. || MAS || align=right data-sort-value="0.87" | 870 m || 
|-id=312 bgcolor=#fefefe
| 346312 ||  || — || August 21, 2008 || Kitt Peak || Spacewatch || — || align=right data-sort-value="0.73" | 730 m || 
|-id=313 bgcolor=#fefefe
| 346313 ||  || — || August 27, 2008 || La Sagra || OAM Obs. || NYS || align=right data-sort-value="0.77" | 770 m || 
|-id=314 bgcolor=#fefefe
| 346314 ||  || — || August 29, 2008 || Taunus || S. Karge, R. Kling || V || align=right data-sort-value="0.63" | 630 m || 
|-id=315 bgcolor=#fefefe
| 346315 ||  || — || August 30, 2008 || Sandlot || G. Hug || FLO || align=right data-sort-value="0.63" | 630 m || 
|-id=316 bgcolor=#fefefe
| 346316 ||  || — || August 29, 2008 || La Sagra || OAM Obs. || MAS || align=right data-sort-value="0.69" | 690 m || 
|-id=317 bgcolor=#fefefe
| 346317 ||  || — || August 30, 2008 || Socorro || LINEAR || V || align=right data-sort-value="0.82" | 820 m || 
|-id=318 bgcolor=#fefefe
| 346318 ||  || — || August 31, 2008 || Moletai || Molėtai Obs. || SUL || align=right | 2.0 km || 
|-id=319 bgcolor=#fefefe
| 346319 ||  || — || August 21, 2008 || Kitt Peak || Spacewatch || — || align=right data-sort-value="0.80" | 800 m || 
|-id=320 bgcolor=#E9E9E9
| 346320 ||  || — || August 24, 2008 || Kitt Peak || Spacewatch || — || align=right | 2.9 km || 
|-id=321 bgcolor=#fefefe
| 346321 ||  || — || August 26, 2008 || La Sagra || OAM Obs. || — || align=right data-sort-value="0.86" | 860 m || 
|-id=322 bgcolor=#E9E9E9
| 346322 ||  || — || August 26, 2008 || La Sagra || OAM Obs. || AER || align=right | 1.6 km || 
|-id=323 bgcolor=#fefefe
| 346323 ||  || — || August 24, 2008 || Kitt Peak || Spacewatch || FLO || align=right data-sort-value="0.86" | 860 m || 
|-id=324 bgcolor=#fefefe
| 346324 ||  || — || September 1, 2008 || Hibiscus || S. F. Hönig, N. Teamo || ERI || align=right | 1.8 km || 
|-id=325 bgcolor=#fefefe
| 346325 ||  || — || September 3, 2008 || Hibiscus || S. F. Hönig, N. Teamo || — || align=right | 1.2 km || 
|-id=326 bgcolor=#fefefe
| 346326 ||  || — || September 2, 2008 || Kitt Peak || Spacewatch || NYS || align=right data-sort-value="0.71" | 710 m || 
|-id=327 bgcolor=#fefefe
| 346327 ||  || — || September 2, 2008 || Kitt Peak || Spacewatch || — || align=right data-sort-value="0.91" | 910 m || 
|-id=328 bgcolor=#fefefe
| 346328 ||  || — || August 24, 2008 || Kitt Peak || Spacewatch || — || align=right | 1.0 km || 
|-id=329 bgcolor=#fefefe
| 346329 ||  || — || August 15, 2004 || Campo Imperatore || CINEOS || V || align=right data-sort-value="0.59" | 590 m || 
|-id=330 bgcolor=#fefefe
| 346330 ||  || — || September 3, 2008 || La Sagra || OAM Obs. || NYS || align=right data-sort-value="0.66" | 660 m || 
|-id=331 bgcolor=#E9E9E9
| 346331 ||  || — || September 8, 2008 || Dauban || F. Kugel || — || align=right | 3.4 km || 
|-id=332 bgcolor=#fefefe
| 346332 ||  || — || September 2, 2008 || Kitt Peak || Spacewatch || — || align=right | 1.1 km || 
|-id=333 bgcolor=#fefefe
| 346333 ||  || — || September 2, 2008 || Kitt Peak || Spacewatch || NYS || align=right data-sort-value="0.66" | 660 m || 
|-id=334 bgcolor=#fefefe
| 346334 ||  || — || September 2, 2008 || Kitt Peak || Spacewatch || V || align=right data-sort-value="0.74" | 740 m || 
|-id=335 bgcolor=#fefefe
| 346335 ||  || — || September 2, 2008 || Kitt Peak || Spacewatch || — || align=right data-sort-value="0.93" | 930 m || 
|-id=336 bgcolor=#fefefe
| 346336 ||  || — || September 2, 2008 || Kitt Peak || Spacewatch || MAS || align=right data-sort-value="0.65" | 650 m || 
|-id=337 bgcolor=#fefefe
| 346337 ||  || — || September 3, 2008 || La Sagra || OAM Obs. || V || align=right data-sort-value="0.78" | 780 m || 
|-id=338 bgcolor=#fefefe
| 346338 ||  || — || September 3, 2008 || Kitt Peak || Spacewatch || — || align=right data-sort-value="0.85" | 850 m || 
|-id=339 bgcolor=#fefefe
| 346339 ||  || — || September 3, 2008 || Kitt Peak || Spacewatch || — || align=right data-sort-value="0.94" | 940 m || 
|-id=340 bgcolor=#fefefe
| 346340 ||  || — || September 4, 2008 || Kitt Peak || Spacewatch || — || align=right | 1.2 km || 
|-id=341 bgcolor=#fefefe
| 346341 ||  || — || September 4, 2008 || Kitt Peak || Spacewatch || — || align=right data-sort-value="0.86" | 860 m || 
|-id=342 bgcolor=#fefefe
| 346342 ||  || — || September 6, 2008 || Catalina || CSS || V || align=right data-sort-value="0.78" | 780 m || 
|-id=343 bgcolor=#E9E9E9
| 346343 ||  || — || September 6, 2008 || Catalina || CSS || JUN || align=right | 1.00 km || 
|-id=344 bgcolor=#E9E9E9
| 346344 ||  || — || September 3, 2008 || Kitt Peak || Spacewatch || — || align=right | 3.4 km || 
|-id=345 bgcolor=#fefefe
| 346345 ||  || — || September 5, 2008 || Kitt Peak || Spacewatch || V || align=right data-sort-value="0.87" | 870 m || 
|-id=346 bgcolor=#E9E9E9
| 346346 ||  || — || September 7, 2008 || Mount Lemmon || Mount Lemmon Survey || — || align=right | 1.00 km || 
|-id=347 bgcolor=#fefefe
| 346347 ||  || — || September 3, 2008 || Kitt Peak || Spacewatch || NYS || align=right data-sort-value="0.55" | 550 m || 
|-id=348 bgcolor=#fefefe
| 346348 ||  || — || September 4, 2008 || Kitt Peak || Spacewatch || — || align=right | 1.1 km || 
|-id=349 bgcolor=#fefefe
| 346349 ||  || — || September 6, 2008 || Mount Lemmon || Mount Lemmon Survey || — || align=right data-sort-value="0.86" | 860 m || 
|-id=350 bgcolor=#fefefe
| 346350 ||  || — || September 6, 2008 || Mount Lemmon || Mount Lemmon Survey || — || align=right data-sort-value="0.83" | 830 m || 
|-id=351 bgcolor=#E9E9E9
| 346351 ||  || — || September 9, 2008 || Mount Lemmon || Mount Lemmon Survey || AEO || align=right | 1.0 km || 
|-id=352 bgcolor=#fefefe
| 346352 ||  || — || September 9, 2008 || Mount Lemmon || Mount Lemmon Survey || NYSfast? || align=right data-sort-value="0.84" | 840 m || 
|-id=353 bgcolor=#E9E9E9
| 346353 ||  || — || September 9, 2008 || Mount Lemmon || Mount Lemmon Survey || — || align=right data-sort-value="0.94" | 940 m || 
|-id=354 bgcolor=#E9E9E9
| 346354 ||  || — || September 9, 2008 || Mount Lemmon || Mount Lemmon Survey || — || align=right data-sort-value="0.89" | 890 m || 
|-id=355 bgcolor=#E9E9E9
| 346355 ||  || — || September 9, 2008 || Mount Lemmon || Mount Lemmon Survey || — || align=right | 2.2 km || 
|-id=356 bgcolor=#fefefe
| 346356 ||  || — || September 6, 2008 || Catalina || CSS || — || align=right | 1.2 km || 
|-id=357 bgcolor=#fefefe
| 346357 ||  || — || September 5, 2008 || Kitt Peak || Spacewatch || — || align=right | 1.00 km || 
|-id=358 bgcolor=#fefefe
| 346358 ||  || — || September 6, 2008 || Catalina || CSS || — || align=right | 1.0 km || 
|-id=359 bgcolor=#E9E9E9
| 346359 ||  || — || September 6, 2008 || Catalina || CSS || — || align=right | 2.8 km || 
|-id=360 bgcolor=#fefefe
| 346360 ||  || — || September 7, 2008 || Mount Lemmon || Mount Lemmon Survey || FLO || align=right data-sort-value="0.90" | 900 m || 
|-id=361 bgcolor=#E9E9E9
| 346361 ||  || — || September 9, 2008 || Mount Lemmon || Mount Lemmon Survey || — || align=right | 2.3 km || 
|-id=362 bgcolor=#fefefe
| 346362 ||  || — || September 7, 2008 || Mount Lemmon || Mount Lemmon Survey || NYS || align=right data-sort-value="0.66" | 660 m || 
|-id=363 bgcolor=#fefefe
| 346363 ||  || — || September 23, 2008 || Sierra Stars || F. Tozzi || NYS || align=right data-sort-value="0.89" | 890 m || 
|-id=364 bgcolor=#fefefe
| 346364 ||  || — || September 22, 2008 || Socorro || LINEAR || NYS || align=right data-sort-value="0.70" | 700 m || 
|-id=365 bgcolor=#fefefe
| 346365 ||  || — || September 22, 2008 || Socorro || LINEAR || NYS || align=right data-sort-value="0.75" | 750 m || 
|-id=366 bgcolor=#E9E9E9
| 346366 ||  || — || September 22, 2008 || Socorro || LINEAR || — || align=right | 1.9 km || 
|-id=367 bgcolor=#fefefe
| 346367 ||  || — || September 19, 2008 || Kitt Peak || Spacewatch || — || align=right | 1.1 km || 
|-id=368 bgcolor=#fefefe
| 346368 ||  || — || September 19, 2008 || Kitt Peak || Spacewatch || — || align=right | 1.2 km || 
|-id=369 bgcolor=#fefefe
| 346369 ||  || — || November 29, 1997 || Kitt Peak || Spacewatch || MAS || align=right data-sort-value="0.76" | 760 m || 
|-id=370 bgcolor=#fefefe
| 346370 ||  || — || September 19, 2008 || Kitt Peak || Spacewatch || NYS || align=right data-sort-value="0.69" | 690 m || 
|-id=371 bgcolor=#fefefe
| 346371 ||  || — || September 19, 2008 || Kitt Peak || Spacewatch || — || align=right data-sort-value="0.92" | 920 m || 
|-id=372 bgcolor=#fefefe
| 346372 ||  || — || October 10, 1993 || Kitt Peak || Spacewatch || — || align=right data-sort-value="0.90" | 900 m || 
|-id=373 bgcolor=#fefefe
| 346373 ||  || — || September 20, 2008 || Kitt Peak || Spacewatch || NYS || align=right data-sort-value="0.83" | 830 m || 
|-id=374 bgcolor=#fefefe
| 346374 ||  || — || September 20, 2008 || Kitt Peak || Spacewatch || — || align=right | 1.1 km || 
|-id=375 bgcolor=#fefefe
| 346375 ||  || — || September 20, 2008 || Kitt Peak || Spacewatch || V || align=right data-sort-value="0.71" | 710 m || 
|-id=376 bgcolor=#fefefe
| 346376 ||  || — || September 20, 2008 || Kitt Peak || Spacewatch || NYS || align=right data-sort-value="0.76" | 760 m || 
|-id=377 bgcolor=#fefefe
| 346377 ||  || — || September 20, 2008 || Kitt Peak || Spacewatch || — || align=right data-sort-value="0.88" | 880 m || 
|-id=378 bgcolor=#E9E9E9
| 346378 ||  || — || September 20, 2008 || Kitt Peak || Spacewatch || — || align=right | 1.6 km || 
|-id=379 bgcolor=#fefefe
| 346379 ||  || — || September 20, 2008 || Mount Lemmon || Mount Lemmon Survey || — || align=right data-sort-value="0.79" | 790 m || 
|-id=380 bgcolor=#fefefe
| 346380 ||  || — || September 20, 2008 || Mount Lemmon || Mount Lemmon Survey || FLO || align=right data-sort-value="0.76" | 760 m || 
|-id=381 bgcolor=#E9E9E9
| 346381 ||  || — || September 20, 2008 || Mount Lemmon || Mount Lemmon Survey || — || align=right | 2.1 km || 
|-id=382 bgcolor=#fefefe
| 346382 ||  || — || September 20, 2008 || Mount Lemmon || Mount Lemmon Survey || NYS || align=right data-sort-value="0.59" | 590 m || 
|-id=383 bgcolor=#E9E9E9
| 346383 ||  || — || September 20, 2008 || Mount Lemmon || Mount Lemmon Survey || CLO || align=right | 2.0 km || 
|-id=384 bgcolor=#fefefe
| 346384 ||  || — || September 20, 2008 || Catalina || CSS || — || align=right data-sort-value="0.86" | 860 m || 
|-id=385 bgcolor=#fefefe
| 346385 ||  || — || September 21, 2008 || Kitt Peak || Spacewatch || NYS || align=right data-sort-value="0.88" | 880 m || 
|-id=386 bgcolor=#fefefe
| 346386 ||  || — || September 21, 2008 || Catalina || CSS || — || align=right | 1.1 km || 
|-id=387 bgcolor=#E9E9E9
| 346387 ||  || — || September 21, 2008 || Catalina || CSS || — || align=right | 2.0 km || 
|-id=388 bgcolor=#fefefe
| 346388 ||  || — || September 22, 2008 || Goodricke-Pigott || R. A. Tucker || NYS || align=right data-sort-value="0.83" | 830 m || 
|-id=389 bgcolor=#fefefe
| 346389 ||  || — || August 24, 2008 || Kitt Peak || Spacewatch || — || align=right data-sort-value="0.76" | 760 m || 
|-id=390 bgcolor=#fefefe
| 346390 ||  || — || September 3, 2008 || Kitt Peak || Spacewatch || — || align=right data-sort-value="0.77" | 770 m || 
|-id=391 bgcolor=#E9E9E9
| 346391 ||  || — || September 28, 2008 || Wrightwood || J. W. Young || — || align=right | 1.9 km || 
|-id=392 bgcolor=#fefefe
| 346392 ||  || — || September 20, 2008 || Catalina || CSS || NYS || align=right data-sort-value="0.80" | 800 m || 
|-id=393 bgcolor=#fefefe
| 346393 ||  || — || September 20, 2008 || Catalina || CSS || — || align=right | 1.0 km || 
|-id=394 bgcolor=#fefefe
| 346394 ||  || — || September 21, 2008 || Kitt Peak || Spacewatch || — || align=right | 1.0 km || 
|-id=395 bgcolor=#E9E9E9
| 346395 ||  || — || September 21, 2008 || Kitt Peak || Spacewatch || — || align=right data-sort-value="0.85" | 850 m || 
|-id=396 bgcolor=#fefefe
| 346396 ||  || — || September 21, 2008 || Kitt Peak || Spacewatch || NYS || align=right data-sort-value="0.72" | 720 m || 
|-id=397 bgcolor=#fefefe
| 346397 ||  || — || September 22, 2008 || Kitt Peak || Spacewatch || — || align=right | 1.4 km || 
|-id=398 bgcolor=#fefefe
| 346398 ||  || — || September 22, 2008 || Mount Lemmon || Mount Lemmon Survey || NYS || align=right data-sort-value="0.64" | 640 m || 
|-id=399 bgcolor=#d6d6d6
| 346399 ||  || — || September 22, 2008 || Mount Lemmon || Mount Lemmon Survey || KOR || align=right | 1.6 km || 
|-id=400 bgcolor=#fefefe
| 346400 ||  || — || September 22, 2008 || Kitt Peak || Spacewatch || — || align=right data-sort-value="0.96" | 960 m || 
|}

346401–346500 

|-bgcolor=#E9E9E9
| 346401 ||  || — || September 23, 2008 || Mount Lemmon || Mount Lemmon Survey || HOF || align=right | 2.4 km || 
|-id=402 bgcolor=#fefefe
| 346402 ||  || — || September 25, 2008 || Bergisch Gladbach || W. Bickel || — || align=right | 1.0 km || 
|-id=403 bgcolor=#E9E9E9
| 346403 ||  || — || September 24, 2008 || Bergisch Gladbac || W. Bickel || GEF || align=right | 1.5 km || 
|-id=404 bgcolor=#fefefe
| 346404 ||  || — || September 26, 2008 || Bisei SG Center || BATTeRS || — || align=right | 1.3 km || 
|-id=405 bgcolor=#E9E9E9
| 346405 ||  || — || September 22, 2008 || Socorro || LINEAR || ADE || align=right | 2.1 km || 
|-id=406 bgcolor=#fefefe
| 346406 ||  || — || September 19, 2008 || Kitt Peak || Spacewatch || EUT || align=right data-sort-value="0.75" | 750 m || 
|-id=407 bgcolor=#fefefe
| 346407 ||  || — || September 23, 2008 || Socorro || LINEAR || MAS || align=right data-sort-value="0.80" | 800 m || 
|-id=408 bgcolor=#fefefe
| 346408 ||  || — || September 23, 2008 || Socorro || LINEAR || NYS || align=right data-sort-value="0.83" | 830 m || 
|-id=409 bgcolor=#fefefe
| 346409 ||  || — || September 23, 2008 || Socorro || LINEAR || ERI || align=right | 1.9 km || 
|-id=410 bgcolor=#E9E9E9
| 346410 ||  || — || September 24, 2008 || Socorro || LINEAR || — || align=right | 1.8 km || 
|-id=411 bgcolor=#fefefe
| 346411 ||  || — || September 28, 2008 || Socorro || LINEAR || — || align=right | 2.7 km || 
|-id=412 bgcolor=#E9E9E9
| 346412 ||  || — || September 28, 2008 || Socorro || LINEAR || — || align=right | 2.4 km || 
|-id=413 bgcolor=#E9E9E9
| 346413 ||  || — || September 28, 2008 || Socorro || LINEAR || — || align=right | 2.0 km || 
|-id=414 bgcolor=#fefefe
| 346414 ||  || — || September 23, 2008 || Siding Spring || SSS || NYS || align=right data-sort-value="0.72" | 720 m || 
|-id=415 bgcolor=#fefefe
| 346415 ||  || — || September 24, 2008 || Kitt Peak || Spacewatch || — || align=right data-sort-value="0.94" | 940 m || 
|-id=416 bgcolor=#fefefe
| 346416 ||  || — || September 24, 2008 || Kitt Peak || Spacewatch || MAS || align=right data-sort-value="0.77" | 770 m || 
|-id=417 bgcolor=#fefefe
| 346417 ||  || — || January 14, 2002 || Kitt Peak || Spacewatch || MAS || align=right data-sort-value="0.73" | 730 m || 
|-id=418 bgcolor=#E9E9E9
| 346418 ||  || — || September 24, 2008 || Kitt Peak || Spacewatch || — || align=right | 1.0 km || 
|-id=419 bgcolor=#E9E9E9
| 346419 ||  || — || September 25, 2008 || Kitt Peak || Spacewatch || — || align=right | 1.7 km || 
|-id=420 bgcolor=#fefefe
| 346420 ||  || — || September 25, 2008 || Kitt Peak || Spacewatch || V || align=right data-sort-value="0.79" | 790 m || 
|-id=421 bgcolor=#fefefe
| 346421 ||  || — || September 25, 2008 || Kitt Peak || Spacewatch || — || align=right | 2.9 km || 
|-id=422 bgcolor=#E9E9E9
| 346422 ||  || — || September 25, 2008 || Kitt Peak || Spacewatch || — || align=right data-sort-value="0.96" | 960 m || 
|-id=423 bgcolor=#E9E9E9
| 346423 ||  || — || September 25, 2008 || Kitt Peak || Spacewatch || — || align=right data-sort-value="0.94" | 940 m || 
|-id=424 bgcolor=#E9E9E9
| 346424 ||  || — || September 26, 2008 || Kitt Peak || Spacewatch || — || align=right | 1.1 km || 
|-id=425 bgcolor=#fefefe
| 346425 ||  || — || September 26, 2008 || Kitt Peak || Spacewatch || — || align=right | 1.1 km || 
|-id=426 bgcolor=#fefefe
| 346426 ||  || — || September 30, 2008 || La Sagra || OAM Obs. || — || align=right | 1.0 km || 
|-id=427 bgcolor=#E9E9E9
| 346427 ||  || — || September 26, 2008 || Kitt Peak || Spacewatch || — || align=right | 2.2 km || 
|-id=428 bgcolor=#E9E9E9
| 346428 ||  || — || September 28, 2008 || Mount Lemmon || Mount Lemmon Survey || HEN || align=right data-sort-value="0.94" | 940 m || 
|-id=429 bgcolor=#fefefe
| 346429 ||  || — || September 29, 2008 || Kitt Peak || Spacewatch || NYS || align=right data-sort-value="0.74" | 740 m || 
|-id=430 bgcolor=#fefefe
| 346430 ||  || — || September 10, 2008 || Kitt Peak || Spacewatch || MAS || align=right data-sort-value="0.75" | 750 m || 
|-id=431 bgcolor=#E9E9E9
| 346431 ||  || — || September 29, 2008 || Kitt Peak || Spacewatch || — || align=right data-sort-value="0.88" | 880 m || 
|-id=432 bgcolor=#fefefe
| 346432 ||  || — || September 20, 2008 || Kitt Peak || Spacewatch || EUT || align=right data-sort-value="0.61" | 610 m || 
|-id=433 bgcolor=#E9E9E9
| 346433 ||  || — || June 3, 2003 || Kitt Peak || Spacewatch || — || align=right data-sort-value="0.87" | 870 m || 
|-id=434 bgcolor=#fefefe
| 346434 ||  || — || September 21, 2008 || Kitt Peak || Spacewatch || — || align=right | 1.2 km || 
|-id=435 bgcolor=#fefefe
| 346435 ||  || — || September 23, 2008 || Mount Lemmon || Mount Lemmon Survey || SUL || align=right | 2.8 km || 
|-id=436 bgcolor=#fefefe
| 346436 ||  || — || September 22, 2008 || Catalina || CSS || V || align=right data-sort-value="0.79" | 790 m || 
|-id=437 bgcolor=#E9E9E9
| 346437 ||  || — || September 29, 2008 || Kitt Peak || Spacewatch || — || align=right | 2.0 km || 
|-id=438 bgcolor=#fefefe
| 346438 ||  || — || September 23, 2008 || Kitt Peak || Spacewatch || — || align=right | 1.1 km || 
|-id=439 bgcolor=#E9E9E9
| 346439 ||  || — || September 25, 2008 || Mount Lemmon || Mount Lemmon Survey || — || align=right data-sort-value="0.95" | 950 m || 
|-id=440 bgcolor=#E9E9E9
| 346440 ||  || — || September 23, 2008 || Catalina || CSS || EUN || align=right | 2.0 km || 
|-id=441 bgcolor=#fefefe
| 346441 ||  || — || September 30, 2008 || Mount Lemmon || Mount Lemmon Survey || — || align=right | 2.8 km || 
|-id=442 bgcolor=#E9E9E9
| 346442 ||  || — || October 4, 2008 || Catalina || CSS || — || align=right | 2.5 km || 
|-id=443 bgcolor=#fefefe
| 346443 ||  || — || October 3, 2008 || La Sagra || OAM Obs. || V || align=right data-sort-value="0.68" | 680 m || 
|-id=444 bgcolor=#fefefe
| 346444 ||  || — || October 4, 2008 || La Sagra || OAM Obs. || NYS || align=right data-sort-value="0.84" | 840 m || 
|-id=445 bgcolor=#fefefe
| 346445 ||  || — || September 2, 2008 || Kitt Peak || Spacewatch || — || align=right | 1.0 km || 
|-id=446 bgcolor=#fefefe
| 346446 ||  || — || October 1, 2008 || Mount Lemmon || Mount Lemmon Survey || — || align=right data-sort-value="0.90" | 900 m || 
|-id=447 bgcolor=#E9E9E9
| 346447 ||  || — || September 22, 2008 || Mount Lemmon || Mount Lemmon Survey || — || align=right data-sort-value="0.88" | 880 m || 
|-id=448 bgcolor=#E9E9E9
| 346448 ||  || — || October 1, 2008 || Mount Lemmon || Mount Lemmon Survey || — || align=right | 1.0 km || 
|-id=449 bgcolor=#fefefe
| 346449 ||  || — || October 1, 2008 || Mount Lemmon || Mount Lemmon Survey || MAS || align=right data-sort-value="0.76" | 760 m || 
|-id=450 bgcolor=#E9E9E9
| 346450 ||  || — || April 25, 2007 || Mount Lemmon || Mount Lemmon Survey || MAR || align=right data-sort-value="0.94" | 940 m || 
|-id=451 bgcolor=#E9E9E9
| 346451 ||  || — || October 10, 2008 || Mount Lemmon || Mount Lemmon Survey || JUN || align=right | 1.3 km || 
|-id=452 bgcolor=#E9E9E9
| 346452 ||  || — || October 1, 2008 || Kitt Peak || Spacewatch || HEN || align=right | 1.2 km || 
|-id=453 bgcolor=#E9E9E9
| 346453 ||  || — || October 1, 2008 || Kitt Peak || Spacewatch || MAR || align=right | 1.2 km || 
|-id=454 bgcolor=#fefefe
| 346454 ||  || — || October 2, 2008 || Kitt Peak || Spacewatch || MAS || align=right data-sort-value="0.76" | 760 m || 
|-id=455 bgcolor=#fefefe
| 346455 ||  || — || October 2, 2008 || Kitt Peak || Spacewatch || — || align=right data-sort-value="0.76" | 760 m || 
|-id=456 bgcolor=#fefefe
| 346456 ||  || — || October 2, 2008 || Kitt Peak || Spacewatch || MAS || align=right data-sort-value="0.80" | 800 m || 
|-id=457 bgcolor=#E9E9E9
| 346457 ||  || — || October 2, 2008 || Kitt Peak || Spacewatch || JUN || align=right | 1.0 km || 
|-id=458 bgcolor=#fefefe
| 346458 ||  || — || October 2, 2008 || Mount Lemmon || Mount Lemmon Survey || MAS || align=right data-sort-value="0.72" | 720 m || 
|-id=459 bgcolor=#fefefe
| 346459 ||  || — || October 3, 2008 || Kitt Peak || Spacewatch || NYS || align=right data-sort-value="0.63" | 630 m || 
|-id=460 bgcolor=#fefefe
| 346460 ||  || — || October 3, 2008 || Kitt Peak || Spacewatch || — || align=right data-sort-value="0.91" | 910 m || 
|-id=461 bgcolor=#fefefe
| 346461 ||  || — || October 3, 2008 || Mount Lemmon || Mount Lemmon Survey || V || align=right data-sort-value="0.85" | 850 m || 
|-id=462 bgcolor=#E9E9E9
| 346462 ||  || — || October 3, 2008 || Kitt Peak || Spacewatch || — || align=right data-sort-value="0.74" | 740 m || 
|-id=463 bgcolor=#fefefe
| 346463 ||  || — || October 5, 2008 || La Sagra || OAM Obs. || NYS || align=right data-sort-value="0.61" | 610 m || 
|-id=464 bgcolor=#fefefe
| 346464 ||  || — || October 6, 2008 || Catalina || CSS || V || align=right data-sort-value="0.63" | 630 m || 
|-id=465 bgcolor=#E9E9E9
| 346465 ||  || — || October 7, 2008 || Mount Lemmon || Mount Lemmon Survey || — || align=right | 1.7 km || 
|-id=466 bgcolor=#E9E9E9
| 346466 ||  || — || October 7, 2008 || Kitt Peak || Spacewatch || — || align=right data-sort-value="0.90" | 900 m || 
|-id=467 bgcolor=#fefefe
| 346467 ||  || — || October 8, 2008 || Mount Lemmon || Mount Lemmon Survey || — || align=right | 1.3 km || 
|-id=468 bgcolor=#fefefe
| 346468 ||  || — || October 8, 2008 || Mount Lemmon || Mount Lemmon Survey || — || align=right | 1.0 km || 
|-id=469 bgcolor=#fefefe
| 346469 ||  || — || October 9, 2008 || Mount Lemmon || Mount Lemmon Survey || — || align=right | 1.1 km || 
|-id=470 bgcolor=#E9E9E9
| 346470 ||  || — || October 10, 2008 || Kitt Peak || Spacewatch || — || align=right data-sort-value="0.93" | 930 m || 
|-id=471 bgcolor=#E9E9E9
| 346471 ||  || — || October 1, 2008 || Charleston || ARO || — || align=right | 2.1 km || 
|-id=472 bgcolor=#E9E9E9
| 346472 ||  || — || October 2, 2008 || Kitt Peak || Spacewatch || — || align=right data-sort-value="0.81" | 810 m || 
|-id=473 bgcolor=#E9E9E9
| 346473 ||  || — || October 1, 2008 || Catalina || CSS || MAR || align=right | 1.3 km || 
|-id=474 bgcolor=#fefefe
| 346474 ||  || — || October 2, 2008 || Catalina || CSS || — || align=right | 1.2 km || 
|-id=475 bgcolor=#fefefe
| 346475 ||  || — || October 1, 2008 || Kitt Peak || Spacewatch || — || align=right | 1.1 km || 
|-id=476 bgcolor=#fefefe
| 346476 ||  || — || October 2, 2008 || Socorro || LINEAR || V || align=right | 1.0 km || 
|-id=477 bgcolor=#fefefe
| 346477 ||  || — || October 6, 2008 || Mount Lemmon || Mount Lemmon Survey || — || align=right | 1.0 km || 
|-id=478 bgcolor=#fefefe
| 346478 ||  || — || October 7, 2008 || Mount Lemmon || Mount Lemmon Survey || — || align=right | 1.3 km || 
|-id=479 bgcolor=#FA8072
| 346479 ||  || — || October 17, 2008 || Siding Spring || SSS || — || align=right | 1.2 km || 
|-id=480 bgcolor=#E9E9E9
| 346480 ||  || — || October 20, 2008 || Goodricke-Pigott || R. A. Tucker || — || align=right | 1.6 km || 
|-id=481 bgcolor=#E9E9E9
| 346481 ||  || — || October 25, 2008 || Catalina || CSS || — || align=right | 2.6 km || 
|-id=482 bgcolor=#fefefe
| 346482 ||  || — || October 17, 2008 || Kitt Peak || Spacewatch || NYS || align=right data-sort-value="0.84" | 840 m || 
|-id=483 bgcolor=#fefefe
| 346483 ||  || — || October 20, 2008 || Kitt Peak || Spacewatch || SUL || align=right | 2.7 km || 
|-id=484 bgcolor=#E9E9E9
| 346484 ||  || — || October 20, 2008 || Kitt Peak || Spacewatch || — || align=right | 1.4 km || 
|-id=485 bgcolor=#E9E9E9
| 346485 ||  || — || October 20, 2008 || Kitt Peak || Spacewatch || KRM || align=right | 1.9 km || 
|-id=486 bgcolor=#E9E9E9
| 346486 ||  || — || September 22, 2008 || Mount Lemmon || Mount Lemmon Survey || — || align=right | 1.5 km || 
|-id=487 bgcolor=#E9E9E9
| 346487 ||  || — || October 20, 2008 || Kitt Peak || Spacewatch || — || align=right | 1.5 km || 
|-id=488 bgcolor=#E9E9E9
| 346488 ||  || — || October 20, 2008 || Mount Lemmon || Mount Lemmon Survey || EUN || align=right data-sort-value="0.96" | 960 m || 
|-id=489 bgcolor=#E9E9E9
| 346489 ||  || — || October 20, 2008 || Kitt Peak || Spacewatch || — || align=right | 2.1 km || 
|-id=490 bgcolor=#E9E9E9
| 346490 ||  || — || October 21, 2008 || Kitt Peak || Spacewatch || — || align=right data-sort-value="0.95" | 950 m || 
|-id=491 bgcolor=#d6d6d6
| 346491 ||  || — || October 21, 2008 || Kitt Peak || Spacewatch || — || align=right | 4.1 km || 
|-id=492 bgcolor=#E9E9E9
| 346492 ||  || — || February 24, 2006 || Mount Lemmon || Mount Lemmon Survey || — || align=right | 1.2 km || 
|-id=493 bgcolor=#E9E9E9
| 346493 ||  || — || October 21, 2008 || Mount Lemmon || Mount Lemmon Survey || — || align=right | 1.5 km || 
|-id=494 bgcolor=#E9E9E9
| 346494 ||  || — || October 21, 2008 || Kitt Peak || Spacewatch || — || align=right | 3.4 km || 
|-id=495 bgcolor=#E9E9E9
| 346495 ||  || — || October 21, 2008 || Kitt Peak || Spacewatch || — || align=right data-sort-value="0.91" | 910 m || 
|-id=496 bgcolor=#E9E9E9
| 346496 ||  || — || October 21, 2008 || Kitt Peak || Spacewatch || — || align=right | 1.1 km || 
|-id=497 bgcolor=#E9E9E9
| 346497 ||  || — || October 21, 2008 || Kitt Peak || Spacewatch || — || align=right | 1.1 km || 
|-id=498 bgcolor=#E9E9E9
| 346498 ||  || — || October 22, 2008 || Kitt Peak || Spacewatch || — || align=right | 2.3 km || 
|-id=499 bgcolor=#E9E9E9
| 346499 ||  || — || October 23, 2008 || Kitt Peak || Spacewatch || — || align=right | 1.7 km || 
|-id=500 bgcolor=#E9E9E9
| 346500 ||  || — || October 23, 2008 || Mount Lemmon || Mount Lemmon Survey || — || align=right data-sort-value="0.89" | 890 m || 
|}

346501–346600 

|-bgcolor=#E9E9E9
| 346501 ||  || — || October 26, 2008 || Socorro || LINEAR || JUN || align=right | 1.4 km || 
|-id=502 bgcolor=#E9E9E9
| 346502 ||  || — || October 28, 2008 || Great Shefford || P. Birtwhistle || — || align=right | 1.3 km || 
|-id=503 bgcolor=#E9E9E9
| 346503 ||  || — || March 24, 2006 || Mount Lemmon || Mount Lemmon Survey || — || align=right data-sort-value="0.93" | 930 m || 
|-id=504 bgcolor=#fefefe
| 346504 ||  || — || October 21, 2008 || Kitt Peak || Spacewatch || NYS || align=right data-sort-value="0.57" | 570 m || 
|-id=505 bgcolor=#fefefe
| 346505 ||  || — || October 22, 2008 || Kitt Peak || Spacewatch || V || align=right data-sort-value="0.73" | 730 m || 
|-id=506 bgcolor=#d6d6d6
| 346506 ||  || — || October 22, 2008 || Kitt Peak || Spacewatch || EOS || align=right | 2.6 km || 
|-id=507 bgcolor=#E9E9E9
| 346507 ||  || — || October 22, 2008 || Kitt Peak || Spacewatch || — || align=right | 1.8 km || 
|-id=508 bgcolor=#fefefe
| 346508 ||  || — || October 23, 2008 || Kitt Peak || Spacewatch || V || align=right data-sort-value="0.88" | 880 m || 
|-id=509 bgcolor=#E9E9E9
| 346509 ||  || — || October 23, 2008 || Kitt Peak || Spacewatch || — || align=right | 1.2 km || 
|-id=510 bgcolor=#fefefe
| 346510 ||  || — || October 23, 2008 || Kitt Peak || Spacewatch || MAS || align=right data-sort-value="0.82" | 820 m || 
|-id=511 bgcolor=#E9E9E9
| 346511 ||  || — || October 23, 2008 || Kitt Peak || Spacewatch || — || align=right data-sort-value="0.88" | 880 m || 
|-id=512 bgcolor=#E9E9E9
| 346512 ||  || — || October 23, 2008 || Kitt Peak || Spacewatch || — || align=right data-sort-value="0.97" | 970 m || 
|-id=513 bgcolor=#E9E9E9
| 346513 ||  || — || October 23, 2008 || Kitt Peak || Spacewatch || — || align=right | 1.1 km || 
|-id=514 bgcolor=#E9E9E9
| 346514 ||  || — || October 23, 2008 || Kitt Peak || Spacewatch || — || align=right | 1.8 km || 
|-id=515 bgcolor=#fefefe
| 346515 ||  || — || October 23, 2008 || Kitt Peak || Spacewatch || — || align=right | 1.2 km || 
|-id=516 bgcolor=#E9E9E9
| 346516 ||  || — || October 23, 2008 || Kitt Peak || Spacewatch || — || align=right | 1.5 km || 
|-id=517 bgcolor=#E9E9E9
| 346517 ||  || — || October 23, 2008 || Kitt Peak || Spacewatch || — || align=right data-sort-value="0.98" | 980 m || 
|-id=518 bgcolor=#E9E9E9
| 346518 ||  || — || October 24, 2008 || Kitt Peak || Spacewatch || — || align=right | 2.9 km || 
|-id=519 bgcolor=#fefefe
| 346519 ||  || — || October 24, 2008 || Kitt Peak || Spacewatch || — || align=right | 1.0 km || 
|-id=520 bgcolor=#fefefe
| 346520 ||  || — || October 24, 2008 || Kitt Peak || Spacewatch || — || align=right | 1.0 km || 
|-id=521 bgcolor=#E9E9E9
| 346521 ||  || — || October 24, 2008 || Mount Lemmon || Mount Lemmon Survey || — || align=right | 1.0 km || 
|-id=522 bgcolor=#d6d6d6
| 346522 ||  || — || October 24, 2008 || Kitt Peak || Spacewatch || — || align=right | 3.4 km || 
|-id=523 bgcolor=#E9E9E9
| 346523 ||  || — || October 24, 2008 || Kitt Peak || Spacewatch || — || align=right | 1.2 km || 
|-id=524 bgcolor=#fefefe
| 346524 ||  || — || October 24, 2008 || Mount Lemmon || Mount Lemmon Survey || NYS || align=right data-sort-value="0.59" | 590 m || 
|-id=525 bgcolor=#fefefe
| 346525 ||  || — || October 24, 2008 || Kitt Peak || Spacewatch || — || align=right | 1.4 km || 
|-id=526 bgcolor=#E9E9E9
| 346526 ||  || — || October 24, 2008 || Kitt Peak || Spacewatch || — || align=right | 1.6 km || 
|-id=527 bgcolor=#fefefe
| 346527 ||  || — || October 27, 2008 || Mount Lemmon || Mount Lemmon Survey || V || align=right data-sort-value="0.69" | 690 m || 
|-id=528 bgcolor=#fefefe
| 346528 ||  || — || October 28, 2008 || Socorro || LINEAR || — || align=right | 1.6 km || 
|-id=529 bgcolor=#fefefe
| 346529 ||  || — || October 25, 2008 || Catalina || CSS || V || align=right | 1.2 km || 
|-id=530 bgcolor=#E9E9E9
| 346530 ||  || — || October 25, 2008 || Catalina || CSS || — || align=right | 1.3 km || 
|-id=531 bgcolor=#E9E9E9
| 346531 ||  || — || October 25, 2008 || Kitt Peak || Spacewatch || — || align=right | 1.7 km || 
|-id=532 bgcolor=#E9E9E9
| 346532 ||  || — || October 25, 2008 || Kitt Peak || Spacewatch || — || align=right | 1.4 km || 
|-id=533 bgcolor=#E9E9E9
| 346533 ||  || — || October 26, 2008 || Kitt Peak || Spacewatch || — || align=right | 1.3 km || 
|-id=534 bgcolor=#E9E9E9
| 346534 ||  || — || October 26, 2008 || Kitt Peak || Spacewatch || — || align=right | 2.2 km || 
|-id=535 bgcolor=#E9E9E9
| 346535 ||  || — || October 26, 2008 || Kitt Peak || Spacewatch || — || align=right | 1.2 km || 
|-id=536 bgcolor=#E9E9E9
| 346536 ||  || — || October 27, 2008 || Mount Lemmon || Mount Lemmon Survey || — || align=right data-sort-value="0.80" | 800 m || 
|-id=537 bgcolor=#E9E9E9
| 346537 ||  || — || September 21, 2008 || Mount Lemmon || Mount Lemmon Survey || POS || align=right | 2.7 km || 
|-id=538 bgcolor=#E9E9E9
| 346538 ||  || — || November 17, 2004 || Campo Imperatore || CINEOS || — || align=right | 2.1 km || 
|-id=539 bgcolor=#fefefe
| 346539 ||  || — || October 28, 2008 || Mount Lemmon || Mount Lemmon Survey || — || align=right | 1.0 km || 
|-id=540 bgcolor=#E9E9E9
| 346540 ||  || — || October 28, 2008 || Kitt Peak || Spacewatch || — || align=right | 2.2 km || 
|-id=541 bgcolor=#E9E9E9
| 346541 ||  || — || October 28, 2008 || Mount Lemmon || Mount Lemmon Survey || — || align=right data-sort-value="0.90" | 900 m || 
|-id=542 bgcolor=#E9E9E9
| 346542 ||  || — || October 28, 2008 || Mount Lemmon || Mount Lemmon Survey || — || align=right | 1.1 km || 
|-id=543 bgcolor=#E9E9E9
| 346543 ||  || — || October 28, 2008 || Kitt Peak || Spacewatch || — || align=right | 1.9 km || 
|-id=544 bgcolor=#E9E9E9
| 346544 ||  || — || October 29, 2008 || Kitt Peak || Spacewatch || — || align=right | 1.1 km || 
|-id=545 bgcolor=#E9E9E9
| 346545 ||  || — || October 29, 2008 || Kitt Peak || Spacewatch || — || align=right | 1.4 km || 
|-id=546 bgcolor=#E9E9E9
| 346546 ||  || — || October 29, 2008 || Kitt Peak || Spacewatch || — || align=right | 1.6 km || 
|-id=547 bgcolor=#E9E9E9
| 346547 ||  || — || October 29, 2008 || Mount Lemmon || Mount Lemmon Survey || — || align=right | 1.0 km || 
|-id=548 bgcolor=#E9E9E9
| 346548 ||  || — || October 29, 2008 || Kitt Peak || Spacewatch || — || align=right | 1.1 km || 
|-id=549 bgcolor=#E9E9E9
| 346549 ||  || — || October 30, 2008 || Mount Lemmon || Mount Lemmon Survey || KRM || align=right | 3.4 km || 
|-id=550 bgcolor=#E9E9E9
| 346550 ||  || — || October 31, 2008 || Kitt Peak || Spacewatch || — || align=right | 1.6 km || 
|-id=551 bgcolor=#E9E9E9
| 346551 ||  || — || October 31, 2008 || Kitt Peak || Spacewatch || — || align=right | 1.4 km || 
|-id=552 bgcolor=#d6d6d6
| 346552 ||  || — || October 31, 2008 || Mount Lemmon || Mount Lemmon Survey || — || align=right | 3.3 km || 
|-id=553 bgcolor=#E9E9E9
| 346553 ||  || — || October 24, 2008 || Catalina || CSS || — || align=right data-sort-value="0.94" | 940 m || 
|-id=554 bgcolor=#E9E9E9
| 346554 ||  || — || October 21, 2008 || Kitt Peak || Spacewatch || — || align=right | 1.9 km || 
|-id=555 bgcolor=#fefefe
| 346555 ||  || — || October 24, 2008 || Kitt Peak || Spacewatch || — || align=right | 1.2 km || 
|-id=556 bgcolor=#E9E9E9
| 346556 ||  || — || October 24, 2008 || Catalina || CSS || EUN || align=right | 1.5 km || 
|-id=557 bgcolor=#E9E9E9
| 346557 ||  || — || October 31, 2008 || Mount Lemmon || Mount Lemmon Survey || — || align=right | 1.5 km || 
|-id=558 bgcolor=#E9E9E9
| 346558 ||  || — || October 21, 2008 || Mount Lemmon || Mount Lemmon Survey || — || align=right | 1.6 km || 
|-id=559 bgcolor=#d6d6d6
| 346559 ||  || — || October 27, 2008 || Mount Lemmon || Mount Lemmon Survey || KAR || align=right | 1.5 km || 
|-id=560 bgcolor=#E9E9E9
| 346560 ||  || — || October 25, 2008 || Mount Lemmon || Mount Lemmon Survey || — || align=right | 1.4 km || 
|-id=561 bgcolor=#E9E9E9
| 346561 ||  || — || October 24, 2008 || Kitt Peak || Spacewatch || — || align=right data-sort-value="0.78" | 780 m || 
|-id=562 bgcolor=#E9E9E9
| 346562 ||  || — || October 24, 2008 || Catalina || CSS || — || align=right | 1.5 km || 
|-id=563 bgcolor=#E9E9E9
| 346563 ||  || — || October 24, 2008 || Mount Lemmon || Mount Lemmon Survey || ADE || align=right | 3.4 km || 
|-id=564 bgcolor=#E9E9E9
| 346564 ||  || — || October 26, 2008 || Mount Lemmon || Mount Lemmon Survey || — || align=right | 2.7 km || 
|-id=565 bgcolor=#E9E9E9
| 346565 ||  || — || November 1, 2008 || Socorro || LINEAR || — || align=right data-sort-value="0.95" | 950 m || 
|-id=566 bgcolor=#E9E9E9
| 346566 ||  || — || November 2, 2008 || Mount Lemmon || Mount Lemmon Survey || — || align=right | 2.5 km || 
|-id=567 bgcolor=#E9E9E9
| 346567 ||  || — || July 30, 2008 || Mount Lemmon || Mount Lemmon Survey || — || align=right | 1.5 km || 
|-id=568 bgcolor=#E9E9E9
| 346568 ||  || — || November 1, 2008 || Kitt Peak || Spacewatch || — || align=right data-sort-value="0.91" | 910 m || 
|-id=569 bgcolor=#E9E9E9
| 346569 ||  || — || November 1, 2008 || Kitt Peak || Spacewatch || — || align=right data-sort-value="0.83" | 830 m || 
|-id=570 bgcolor=#E9E9E9
| 346570 ||  || — || November 1, 2008 || Mount Lemmon || Mount Lemmon Survey || — || align=right | 1.7 km || 
|-id=571 bgcolor=#E9E9E9
| 346571 ||  || — || November 2, 2008 || Kitt Peak || Spacewatch || — || align=right data-sort-value="0.82" | 820 m || 
|-id=572 bgcolor=#E9E9E9
| 346572 ||  || — || November 2, 2008 || Mount Lemmon || Mount Lemmon Survey || — || align=right | 2.5 km || 
|-id=573 bgcolor=#E9E9E9
| 346573 ||  || — || November 3, 2008 || Kitt Peak || Spacewatch || — || align=right data-sort-value="0.99" | 990 m || 
|-id=574 bgcolor=#E9E9E9
| 346574 ||  || — || November 3, 2008 || Mount Lemmon || Mount Lemmon Survey || MAR || align=right | 1.4 km || 
|-id=575 bgcolor=#E9E9E9
| 346575 ||  || — || September 29, 2008 || Mount Lemmon || Mount Lemmon Survey || — || align=right | 2.0 km || 
|-id=576 bgcolor=#E9E9E9
| 346576 ||  || — || September 7, 2008 || Mount Lemmon || Mount Lemmon Survey || — || align=right | 1.2 km || 
|-id=577 bgcolor=#E9E9E9
| 346577 ||  || — || September 22, 2008 || Mount Lemmon || Mount Lemmon Survey || — || align=right | 1.2 km || 
|-id=578 bgcolor=#fefefe
| 346578 ||  || — || November 7, 2008 || Catalina || CSS || MAS || align=right data-sort-value="0.93" | 930 m || 
|-id=579 bgcolor=#E9E9E9
| 346579 ||  || — || November 7, 2008 || Mount Lemmon || Mount Lemmon Survey || HNS || align=right | 1.8 km || 
|-id=580 bgcolor=#E9E9E9
| 346580 ||  || — || November 1, 2008 || Kitt Peak || Spacewatch || — || align=right | 2.6 km || 
|-id=581 bgcolor=#E9E9E9
| 346581 ||  || — || November 9, 2008 || Kitt Peak || Spacewatch || — || align=right | 1.0 km || 
|-id=582 bgcolor=#E9E9E9
| 346582 ||  || — || November 2, 2008 || Mount Lemmon || Mount Lemmon Survey || — || align=right | 2.1 km || 
|-id=583 bgcolor=#E9E9E9
| 346583 ||  || — || November 8, 2008 || Mount Lemmon || Mount Lemmon Survey || HNA || align=right | 2.1 km || 
|-id=584 bgcolor=#E9E9E9
| 346584 ||  || — || November 7, 2008 || Mount Lemmon || Mount Lemmon Survey || — || align=right | 1.4 km || 
|-id=585 bgcolor=#fefefe
| 346585 ||  || — || November 1, 2008 || Mount Lemmon || Mount Lemmon Survey || — || align=right | 1.3 km || 
|-id=586 bgcolor=#E9E9E9
| 346586 ||  || — || November 1, 2008 || Kitt Peak || Spacewatch || EUN || align=right | 1.4 km || 
|-id=587 bgcolor=#E9E9E9
| 346587 ||  || — || November 7, 2008 || Mount Lemmon || Mount Lemmon Survey || — || align=right | 1.3 km || 
|-id=588 bgcolor=#E9E9E9
| 346588 ||  || — || November 7, 2008 || Mount Lemmon || Mount Lemmon Survey || — || align=right | 1.3 km || 
|-id=589 bgcolor=#E9E9E9
| 346589 ||  || — || November 9, 2008 || Mount Lemmon || Mount Lemmon Survey || — || align=right | 1.8 km || 
|-id=590 bgcolor=#E9E9E9
| 346590 ||  || — || November 7, 2008 || Mount Lemmon || Mount Lemmon Survey || — || align=right | 3.3 km || 
|-id=591 bgcolor=#E9E9E9
| 346591 ||  || — || November 6, 2008 || Socorro || LINEAR || ADE || align=right | 3.6 km || 
|-id=592 bgcolor=#d6d6d6
| 346592 ||  || — || November 2, 2008 || Mount Lemmon || Mount Lemmon Survey || — || align=right | 3.6 km || 
|-id=593 bgcolor=#E9E9E9
| 346593 ||  || — || November 17, 2008 || Kitt Peak || Spacewatch || — || align=right | 1.2 km || 
|-id=594 bgcolor=#E9E9E9
| 346594 ||  || — || November 17, 2008 || Kitt Peak || Spacewatch || — || align=right | 1.0 km || 
|-id=595 bgcolor=#fefefe
| 346595 ||  || — || November 17, 2008 || Kitt Peak || Spacewatch || MAS || align=right data-sort-value="0.86" | 860 m || 
|-id=596 bgcolor=#E9E9E9
| 346596 ||  || — || November 17, 2008 || Kitt Peak || Spacewatch || — || align=right data-sort-value="0.92" | 920 m || 
|-id=597 bgcolor=#fefefe
| 346597 ||  || — || November 17, 2008 || Kitt Peak || Spacewatch || — || align=right data-sort-value="0.96" | 960 m || 
|-id=598 bgcolor=#E9E9E9
| 346598 ||  || — || November 18, 2008 || La Sagra || OAM Obs. || — || align=right | 1.2 km || 
|-id=599 bgcolor=#E9E9E9
| 346599 ||  || — || November 18, 2008 || Catalina || CSS || NEM || align=right | 2.8 km || 
|-id=600 bgcolor=#E9E9E9
| 346600 ||  || — || November 18, 2008 || Catalina || CSS || — || align=right | 1.1 km || 
|}

346601–346700 

|-bgcolor=#E9E9E9
| 346601 ||  || — || November 19, 2008 || Mount Lemmon || Mount Lemmon Survey || — || align=right | 1.8 km || 
|-id=602 bgcolor=#E9E9E9
| 346602 ||  || — || November 1, 2008 || Mount Lemmon || Mount Lemmon Survey || — || align=right | 1.2 km || 
|-id=603 bgcolor=#E9E9E9
| 346603 ||  || — || November 17, 2008 || Kitt Peak || Spacewatch || — || align=right | 1.2 km || 
|-id=604 bgcolor=#E9E9E9
| 346604 ||  || — || November 17, 2008 || Kitt Peak || Spacewatch || — || align=right | 1.9 km || 
|-id=605 bgcolor=#E9E9E9
| 346605 ||  || — || November 17, 2008 || Kitt Peak || Spacewatch || — || align=right | 1.4 km || 
|-id=606 bgcolor=#E9E9E9
| 346606 ||  || — || September 30, 2008 || Mount Lemmon || Mount Lemmon Survey || — || align=right | 1.5 km || 
|-id=607 bgcolor=#fefefe
| 346607 ||  || — || November 21, 2008 || Socorro || LINEAR || — || align=right | 1.2 km || 
|-id=608 bgcolor=#E9E9E9
| 346608 ||  || — || November 20, 2008 || Socorro || LINEAR || EUN || align=right | 1.3 km || 
|-id=609 bgcolor=#E9E9E9
| 346609 ||  || — || November 18, 2008 || Catalina || CSS || — || align=right | 2.1 km || 
|-id=610 bgcolor=#E9E9E9
| 346610 ||  || — || November 18, 2008 || Kitt Peak || Spacewatch || — || align=right | 1.2 km || 
|-id=611 bgcolor=#E9E9E9
| 346611 ||  || — || November 19, 2008 || Mount Lemmon || Mount Lemmon Survey || — || align=right | 1.1 km || 
|-id=612 bgcolor=#E9E9E9
| 346612 ||  || — || November 20, 2008 || Kitt Peak || Spacewatch || — || align=right data-sort-value="0.82" | 820 m || 
|-id=613 bgcolor=#E9E9E9
| 346613 ||  || — || November 20, 2008 || Kitt Peak || Spacewatch || — || align=right | 1.3 km || 
|-id=614 bgcolor=#E9E9E9
| 346614 ||  || — || November 20, 2008 || Kitt Peak || Spacewatch || — || align=right | 1.2 km || 
|-id=615 bgcolor=#E9E9E9
| 346615 ||  || — || November 20, 2008 || Kitt Peak || Spacewatch || — || align=right | 1.5 km || 
|-id=616 bgcolor=#E9E9E9
| 346616 ||  || — || November 22, 2008 || Kitt Peak || Spacewatch || EUN || align=right | 1.3 km || 
|-id=617 bgcolor=#E9E9E9
| 346617 ||  || — || November 22, 2008 || Mount Lemmon || Mount Lemmon Survey || — || align=right | 2.3 km || 
|-id=618 bgcolor=#E9E9E9
| 346618 ||  || — || November 7, 2008 || Charleston || ARO || — || align=right | 1.1 km || 
|-id=619 bgcolor=#E9E9E9
| 346619 ||  || — || November 26, 2008 || La Sagra || OAM Obs. || — || align=right | 1.3 km || 
|-id=620 bgcolor=#E9E9E9
| 346620 ||  || — || November 21, 2008 || Cerro Burek || Alianza S4 Obs. || — || align=right | 1.4 km || 
|-id=621 bgcolor=#E9E9E9
| 346621 ||  || — || November 23, 2008 || Socorro || LINEAR || — || align=right | 1.4 km || 
|-id=622 bgcolor=#fefefe
| 346622 ||  || — || November 24, 2008 || Mount Lemmon || Mount Lemmon Survey || V || align=right data-sort-value="0.86" | 860 m || 
|-id=623 bgcolor=#fefefe
| 346623 ||  || — || November 24, 2008 || Mount Lemmon || Mount Lemmon Survey || NYS || align=right data-sort-value="0.93" | 930 m || 
|-id=624 bgcolor=#E9E9E9
| 346624 ||  || — || November 30, 2008 || Kitt Peak || Spacewatch || — || align=right | 1.3 km || 
|-id=625 bgcolor=#E9E9E9
| 346625 ||  || — || November 30, 2008 || Kitt Peak || Spacewatch || — || align=right | 1.0 km || 
|-id=626 bgcolor=#E9E9E9
| 346626 ||  || — || November 30, 2008 || Kitt Peak || Spacewatch || — || align=right | 1.2 km || 
|-id=627 bgcolor=#E9E9E9
| 346627 ||  || — || November 19, 2008 || Mount Lemmon || Mount Lemmon Survey || — || align=right | 2.0 km || 
|-id=628 bgcolor=#E9E9E9
| 346628 ||  || — || November 24, 2008 || Kitt Peak || Spacewatch || NEM || align=right | 1.9 km || 
|-id=629 bgcolor=#E9E9E9
| 346629 ||  || — || November 24, 2008 || Kitt Peak || Spacewatch || — || align=right | 1.0 km || 
|-id=630 bgcolor=#E9E9E9
| 346630 ||  || — || December 9, 2004 || Kitt Peak || Spacewatch || — || align=right | 2.4 km || 
|-id=631 bgcolor=#E9E9E9
| 346631 ||  || — || November 19, 2008 || Kitt Peak || Spacewatch || EUN || align=right | 1.5 km || 
|-id=632 bgcolor=#E9E9E9
| 346632 ||  || — || November 19, 2008 || Kitt Peak || Spacewatch || — || align=right | 1.8 km || 
|-id=633 bgcolor=#fefefe
| 346633 ||  || — || November 19, 2008 || Kitt Peak || Spacewatch || NYS || align=right data-sort-value="0.94" | 940 m || 
|-id=634 bgcolor=#E9E9E9
| 346634 ||  || — || November 24, 2008 || Kitt Peak || Spacewatch || — || align=right | 1.3 km || 
|-id=635 bgcolor=#E9E9E9
| 346635 ||  || — || November 19, 2008 || Kitt Peak || Spacewatch || — || align=right | 2.5 km || 
|-id=636 bgcolor=#E9E9E9
| 346636 ||  || — || November 30, 2008 || Kitt Peak || Spacewatch || — || align=right | 1.3 km || 
|-id=637 bgcolor=#E9E9E9
| 346637 ||  || — || November 19, 2008 || Mount Lemmon || Mount Lemmon Survey || — || align=right | 1.6 km || 
|-id=638 bgcolor=#E9E9E9
| 346638 ||  || — || December 6, 2008 || Bisei SG Center || BATTeRS || — || align=right | 1.3 km || 
|-id=639 bgcolor=#E9E9E9
| 346639 ||  || — || October 7, 2008 || Socorro || LINEAR || IAN || align=right | 1.2 km || 
|-id=640 bgcolor=#E9E9E9
| 346640 ||  || — || December 1, 2008 || Mount Lemmon || Mount Lemmon Survey || — || align=right | 1.6 km || 
|-id=641 bgcolor=#E9E9E9
| 346641 ||  || — || December 2, 2008 || Mount Lemmon || Mount Lemmon Survey || — || align=right | 1.5 km || 
|-id=642 bgcolor=#E9E9E9
| 346642 ||  || — || September 24, 2008 || Mount Lemmon || Mount Lemmon Survey || — || align=right | 1.1 km || 
|-id=643 bgcolor=#E9E9E9
| 346643 ||  || — || December 1, 2008 || Kitt Peak || Spacewatch || — || align=right | 1.7 km || 
|-id=644 bgcolor=#E9E9E9
| 346644 ||  || — || December 1, 2008 || Mount Lemmon || Mount Lemmon Survey || — || align=right | 1.7 km || 
|-id=645 bgcolor=#E9E9E9
| 346645 ||  || — || December 1, 2008 || Kitt Peak || Spacewatch || — || align=right | 3.6 km || 
|-id=646 bgcolor=#E9E9E9
| 346646 ||  || — || December 2, 2008 || Kitt Peak || Spacewatch || — || align=right | 2.9 km || 
|-id=647 bgcolor=#E9E9E9
| 346647 ||  || — || November 22, 2008 || Kitt Peak || Spacewatch || — || align=right | 1.7 km || 
|-id=648 bgcolor=#fefefe
| 346648 ||  || — || December 4, 2008 || Sandlot || G. Hug || — || align=right data-sort-value="0.94" | 940 m || 
|-id=649 bgcolor=#E9E9E9
| 346649 ||  || — || December 7, 2008 || Mount Lemmon || Mount Lemmon Survey || AGN || align=right | 1.3 km || 
|-id=650 bgcolor=#E9E9E9
| 346650 ||  || — || December 1, 2008 || Kitt Peak || Spacewatch || — || align=right | 1.1 km || 
|-id=651 bgcolor=#E9E9E9
| 346651 ||  || — || December 2, 2008 || Socorro || LINEAR || — || align=right | 4.1 km || 
|-id=652 bgcolor=#E9E9E9
| 346652 ||  || — || December 6, 2008 || Socorro || LINEAR || — || align=right | 2.2 km || 
|-id=653 bgcolor=#E9E9E9
| 346653 ||  || — || December 6, 2008 || Kitt Peak || Spacewatch || WIT || align=right | 1.4 km || 
|-id=654 bgcolor=#E9E9E9
| 346654 || 2008 YT || — || December 19, 2008 || Calar Alto || F. Hormuth || RAF || align=right | 1.1 km || 
|-id=655 bgcolor=#E9E9E9
| 346655 ||  || — || January 16, 2005 || Socorro || LINEAR || — || align=right | 1.4 km || 
|-id=656 bgcolor=#E9E9E9
| 346656 ||  || — || September 28, 2003 || Kitt Peak || Spacewatch || — || align=right | 2.0 km || 
|-id=657 bgcolor=#E9E9E9
| 346657 ||  || — || December 22, 2008 || Mayhill || A. Lowe || AGN || align=right | 1.5 km || 
|-id=658 bgcolor=#E9E9E9
| 346658 ||  || — || December 23, 2008 || Dauban || F. Kugel || — || align=right | 2.3 km || 
|-id=659 bgcolor=#E9E9E9
| 346659 ||  || — || December 22, 2008 || La Sagra || OAM Obs. || — || align=right | 4.0 km || 
|-id=660 bgcolor=#E9E9E9
| 346660 ||  || — || December 21, 2008 || Catalina || CSS || — || align=right | 1.2 km || 
|-id=661 bgcolor=#E9E9E9
| 346661 ||  || — || December 20, 2008 || Mount Lemmon || Mount Lemmon Survey || — || align=right | 1.1 km || 
|-id=662 bgcolor=#E9E9E9
| 346662 ||  || — || December 20, 2008 || Lulin || LUSS || — || align=right | 2.5 km || 
|-id=663 bgcolor=#E9E9E9
| 346663 ||  || — || December 21, 2008 || Mount Lemmon || Mount Lemmon Survey || — || align=right | 1.9 km || 
|-id=664 bgcolor=#E9E9E9
| 346664 ||  || — || December 21, 2008 || Kitt Peak || Spacewatch || — || align=right | 3.0 km || 
|-id=665 bgcolor=#E9E9E9
| 346665 ||  || — || December 21, 2008 || Mount Lemmon || Mount Lemmon Survey || NEM || align=right | 3.2 km || 
|-id=666 bgcolor=#E9E9E9
| 346666 ||  || — || December 21, 2008 || Mount Lemmon || Mount Lemmon Survey || — || align=right | 2.0 km || 
|-id=667 bgcolor=#E9E9E9
| 346667 ||  || — || May 25, 2007 || Mount Lemmon || Mount Lemmon Survey || — || align=right | 1.9 km || 
|-id=668 bgcolor=#E9E9E9
| 346668 ||  || — || December 24, 2008 || Dauban || F. Kugel || — || align=right | 2.9 km || 
|-id=669 bgcolor=#E9E9E9
| 346669 ||  || — || December 22, 2008 || Socorro || LINEAR || — || align=right | 1.9 km || 
|-id=670 bgcolor=#E9E9E9
| 346670 ||  || — || December 22, 2008 || Socorro || LINEAR || EUN || align=right | 1.7 km || 
|-id=671 bgcolor=#E9E9E9
| 346671 ||  || — || December 29, 2008 || Mayhill || A. Lowe || — || align=right | 1.0 km || 
|-id=672 bgcolor=#E9E9E9
| 346672 ||  || — || December 27, 2008 || Bisei SG Center || BATTeRS || — || align=right | 1.7 km || 
|-id=673 bgcolor=#E9E9E9
| 346673 ||  || — || December 30, 2008 || Purple Mountain || PMO NEO || — || align=right | 3.4 km || 
|-id=674 bgcolor=#E9E9E9
| 346674 ||  || — || December 29, 2008 || Dauban || F. Kugel || — || align=right | 1.5 km || 
|-id=675 bgcolor=#E9E9E9
| 346675 ||  || — || December 31, 2008 || Bergisch Gladbac || W. Bickel || — || align=right | 2.0 km || 
|-id=676 bgcolor=#E9E9E9
| 346676 ||  || — || December 27, 2008 || Bergisch Gladbac || W. Bickel || NEM || align=right | 2.7 km || 
|-id=677 bgcolor=#E9E9E9
| 346677 ||  || — || December 22, 2008 || Kitt Peak || Spacewatch || — || align=right | 1.6 km || 
|-id=678 bgcolor=#d6d6d6
| 346678 ||  || — || December 29, 2008 || Catalina || CSS || BRA || align=right | 2.1 km || 
|-id=679 bgcolor=#E9E9E9
| 346679 ||  || — || December 29, 2008 || Mount Lemmon || Mount Lemmon Survey || EUN || align=right | 1.4 km || 
|-id=680 bgcolor=#E9E9E9
| 346680 ||  || — || December 30, 2008 || Kitt Peak || Spacewatch || — || align=right | 1.8 km || 
|-id=681 bgcolor=#E9E9E9
| 346681 ||  || — || December 29, 2008 || Mount Lemmon || Mount Lemmon Survey || — || align=right | 2.0 km || 
|-id=682 bgcolor=#E9E9E9
| 346682 ||  || — || December 30, 2008 || Mount Lemmon || Mount Lemmon Survey || AGN || align=right data-sort-value="0.98" | 980 m || 
|-id=683 bgcolor=#E9E9E9
| 346683 ||  || — || December 30, 2008 || Mount Lemmon || Mount Lemmon Survey || — || align=right | 2.0 km || 
|-id=684 bgcolor=#d6d6d6
| 346684 ||  || — || December 30, 2008 || Mount Lemmon || Mount Lemmon Survey || EOS || align=right | 2.3 km || 
|-id=685 bgcolor=#E9E9E9
| 346685 ||  || — || August 24, 2007 || Kitt Peak || Spacewatch || — || align=right | 2.0 km || 
|-id=686 bgcolor=#E9E9E9
| 346686 ||  || — || December 31, 2008 || Kitt Peak || Spacewatch || — || align=right | 1.4 km || 
|-id=687 bgcolor=#E9E9E9
| 346687 ||  || — || December 27, 2008 || Bergisch Gladbac || W. Bickel || HEN || align=right | 1.0 km || 
|-id=688 bgcolor=#d6d6d6
| 346688 ||  || — || December 29, 2008 || Kitt Peak || Spacewatch || — || align=right | 3.1 km || 
|-id=689 bgcolor=#E9E9E9
| 346689 ||  || — || December 31, 2008 || Kitt Peak || Spacewatch || — || align=right | 1.6 km || 
|-id=690 bgcolor=#E9E9E9
| 346690 ||  || — || December 31, 2008 || Catalina || CSS || — || align=right | 3.7 km || 
|-id=691 bgcolor=#E9E9E9
| 346691 ||  || — || December 29, 2008 || Kitt Peak || Spacewatch || AST || align=right | 1.8 km || 
|-id=692 bgcolor=#E9E9E9
| 346692 ||  || — || December 30, 2008 || Kitt Peak || Spacewatch || — || align=right | 2.4 km || 
|-id=693 bgcolor=#E9E9E9
| 346693 ||  || — || December 30, 2008 || Kitt Peak || Spacewatch || HOF || align=right | 3.0 km || 
|-id=694 bgcolor=#E9E9E9
| 346694 ||  || — || December 30, 2008 || Mount Lemmon || Mount Lemmon Survey || — || align=right | 1.6 km || 
|-id=695 bgcolor=#d6d6d6
| 346695 ||  || — || December 30, 2008 || Kitt Peak || Spacewatch || — || align=right | 2.5 km || 
|-id=696 bgcolor=#d6d6d6
| 346696 ||  || — || December 30, 2008 || Kitt Peak || Spacewatch || — || align=right | 2.4 km || 
|-id=697 bgcolor=#d6d6d6
| 346697 ||  || — || December 30, 2008 || Kitt Peak || Spacewatch || KOR || align=right | 1.2 km || 
|-id=698 bgcolor=#d6d6d6
| 346698 ||  || — || December 30, 2008 || Kitt Peak || Spacewatch || — || align=right | 3.2 km || 
|-id=699 bgcolor=#E9E9E9
| 346699 ||  || — || December 30, 2008 || Kitt Peak || Spacewatch || — || align=right | 2.2 km || 
|-id=700 bgcolor=#E9E9E9
| 346700 ||  || — || December 30, 2008 || Mount Lemmon || Mount Lemmon Survey || — || align=right | 1.8 km || 
|}

346701–346800 

|-bgcolor=#d6d6d6
| 346701 ||  || — || December 30, 2008 || Kitt Peak || Spacewatch || — || align=right | 2.4 km || 
|-id=702 bgcolor=#d6d6d6
| 346702 ||  || — || December 22, 2008 || Mount Lemmon || Mount Lemmon Survey || — || align=right | 2.2 km || 
|-id=703 bgcolor=#d6d6d6
| 346703 ||  || — || December 22, 2008 || Kitt Peak || Spacewatch || — || align=right | 2.6 km || 
|-id=704 bgcolor=#E9E9E9
| 346704 ||  || — || December 29, 2008 || Mount Lemmon || Mount Lemmon Survey || NEM || align=right | 2.3 km || 
|-id=705 bgcolor=#d6d6d6
| 346705 ||  || — || December 30, 2008 || Mount Lemmon || Mount Lemmon Survey || — || align=right | 2.4 km || 
|-id=706 bgcolor=#d6d6d6
| 346706 ||  || — || December 31, 2008 || Kitt Peak || Spacewatch || THM || align=right | 2.7 km || 
|-id=707 bgcolor=#E9E9E9
| 346707 ||  || — || December 22, 2008 || Catalina || CSS || — || align=right | 1.8 km || 
|-id=708 bgcolor=#E9E9E9
| 346708 ||  || — || December 22, 2008 || Kitt Peak || Spacewatch || — || align=right | 2.1 km || 
|-id=709 bgcolor=#d6d6d6
| 346709 ||  || — || December 22, 2008 || Mount Lemmon || Mount Lemmon Survey || — || align=right | 2.0 km || 
|-id=710 bgcolor=#E9E9E9
| 346710 ||  || — || December 19, 2008 || Socorro || LINEAR || HNS || align=right | 1.7 km || 
|-id=711 bgcolor=#E9E9E9
| 346711 ||  || — || December 20, 2008 || Socorro || LINEAR || — || align=right | 2.1 km || 
|-id=712 bgcolor=#E9E9E9
| 346712 ||  || — || December 22, 2008 || Kitt Peak || Spacewatch || HOF || align=right | 3.0 km || 
|-id=713 bgcolor=#E9E9E9
| 346713 ||  || — || December 29, 2008 || Mount Lemmon || Mount Lemmon Survey || HOF || align=right | 7.1 km || 
|-id=714 bgcolor=#d6d6d6
| 346714 ||  || — || December 31, 2008 || Mount Lemmon || Mount Lemmon Survey || EOS || align=right | 2.4 km || 
|-id=715 bgcolor=#E9E9E9
| 346715 ||  || — || December 29, 2008 || Catalina || CSS || — || align=right | 1.3 km || 
|-id=716 bgcolor=#E9E9E9
| 346716 ||  || — || January 2, 2009 || Mayhill || A. Lowe || — || align=right | 1.6 km || 
|-id=717 bgcolor=#E9E9E9
| 346717 ||  || — || January 1, 2009 || Dauban || F. Kugel || — || align=right | 1.1 km || 
|-id=718 bgcolor=#d6d6d6
| 346718 ||  || — || January 1, 2009 || Kitt Peak || Spacewatch || KOR || align=right | 1.2 km || 
|-id=719 bgcolor=#d6d6d6
| 346719 ||  || — || January 2, 2009 || Mount Lemmon || Mount Lemmon Survey || — || align=right | 2.3 km || 
|-id=720 bgcolor=#E9E9E9
| 346720 ||  || — || January 2, 2009 || Mount Lemmon || Mount Lemmon Survey || — || align=right | 2.3 km || 
|-id=721 bgcolor=#E9E9E9
| 346721 ||  || — || January 14, 2009 || Weihai || Shandong University Obs. || — || align=right | 1.5 km || 
|-id=722 bgcolor=#E9E9E9
| 346722 ||  || — || January 1, 2009 || Kitt Peak || Spacewatch || — || align=right | 1.4 km || 
|-id=723 bgcolor=#E9E9E9
| 346723 ||  || — || January 1, 2009 || Kitt Peak || Spacewatch || JUN || align=right | 1.0 km || 
|-id=724 bgcolor=#d6d6d6
| 346724 ||  || — || January 2, 2009 || Kitt Peak || Spacewatch || — || align=right | 3.6 km || 
|-id=725 bgcolor=#E9E9E9
| 346725 ||  || — || January 3, 2009 || Kitt Peak || Spacewatch || — || align=right | 2.9 km || 
|-id=726 bgcolor=#E9E9E9
| 346726 ||  || — || September 11, 2007 || Mount Lemmon || Mount Lemmon Survey || — || align=right | 2.1 km || 
|-id=727 bgcolor=#d6d6d6
| 346727 ||  || — || January 3, 2009 || Kitt Peak || Spacewatch || BRA || align=right | 1.5 km || 
|-id=728 bgcolor=#d6d6d6
| 346728 ||  || — || January 2, 2009 || Kitt Peak || Spacewatch || KAR || align=right data-sort-value="0.93" | 930 m || 
|-id=729 bgcolor=#d6d6d6
| 346729 ||  || — || January 2, 2009 || Kitt Peak || Spacewatch || — || align=right | 2.2 km || 
|-id=730 bgcolor=#d6d6d6
| 346730 ||  || — || January 2, 2009 || Kitt Peak || Spacewatch || — || align=right | 2.2 km || 
|-id=731 bgcolor=#d6d6d6
| 346731 ||  || — || January 15, 2009 || Kitt Peak || Spacewatch || KAR || align=right | 1.2 km || 
|-id=732 bgcolor=#E9E9E9
| 346732 ||  || — || January 15, 2009 || Kitt Peak || Spacewatch || PAD || align=right | 1.9 km || 
|-id=733 bgcolor=#E9E9E9
| 346733 ||  || — || January 8, 2009 || Kitt Peak || Spacewatch || WIT || align=right | 1.2 km || 
|-id=734 bgcolor=#E9E9E9
| 346734 ||  || — || January 1, 2009 || Kitt Peak || Spacewatch || — || align=right | 2.7 km || 
|-id=735 bgcolor=#d6d6d6
| 346735 ||  || — || January 15, 2009 || Kitt Peak || Spacewatch || — || align=right | 2.9 km || 
|-id=736 bgcolor=#d6d6d6
| 346736 ||  || — || October 31, 2002 || Palomar || NEAT || — || align=right | 3.6 km || 
|-id=737 bgcolor=#d6d6d6
| 346737 ||  || — || January 18, 2009 || Socorro || LINEAR || — || align=right | 3.1 km || 
|-id=738 bgcolor=#E9E9E9
| 346738 ||  || — || January 18, 2009 || Socorro || LINEAR || — || align=right | 2.2 km || 
|-id=739 bgcolor=#E9E9E9
| 346739 ||  || — || January 17, 2009 || Dauban || F. Kugel || GER || align=right | 1.6 km || 
|-id=740 bgcolor=#E9E9E9
| 346740 ||  || — || January 18, 2009 || Sandlot || G. Hug || MIS || align=right | 2.6 km || 
|-id=741 bgcolor=#E9E9E9
| 346741 ||  || — || January 18, 2009 || Socorro || LINEAR || — || align=right | 2.6 km || 
|-id=742 bgcolor=#E9E9E9
| 346742 ||  || — || January 17, 2009 || Socorro || LINEAR || — || align=right | 1.1 km || 
|-id=743 bgcolor=#E9E9E9
| 346743 ||  || — || January 25, 2009 || Gaisberg || R. Gierlinger || — || align=right | 2.3 km || 
|-id=744 bgcolor=#E9E9E9
| 346744 ||  || — || January 16, 2009 || Kitt Peak || Spacewatch || — || align=right | 1.4 km || 
|-id=745 bgcolor=#E9E9E9
| 346745 ||  || — || January 16, 2009 || Kitt Peak || Spacewatch || — || align=right | 1.6 km || 
|-id=746 bgcolor=#d6d6d6
| 346746 ||  || — || January 16, 2009 || Mount Lemmon || Mount Lemmon Survey || KOR || align=right | 1.2 km || 
|-id=747 bgcolor=#d6d6d6
| 346747 ||  || — || January 16, 2009 || Kitt Peak || Spacewatch || LIX || align=right | 4.7 km || 
|-id=748 bgcolor=#d6d6d6
| 346748 ||  || — || September 13, 2007 || Mount Lemmon || Mount Lemmon Survey || KOR || align=right | 1.1 km || 
|-id=749 bgcolor=#d6d6d6
| 346749 ||  || — || January 16, 2009 || Mount Lemmon || Mount Lemmon Survey || KOR || align=right | 1.5 km || 
|-id=750 bgcolor=#E9E9E9
| 346750 ||  || — || January 17, 2009 || Kitt Peak || Spacewatch || PAD || align=right | 2.1 km || 
|-id=751 bgcolor=#E9E9E9
| 346751 ||  || — || January 16, 2009 || Kitt Peak || Spacewatch || — || align=right | 2.6 km || 
|-id=752 bgcolor=#E9E9E9
| 346752 ||  || — || January 16, 2009 || Kitt Peak || Spacewatch || AST || align=right | 1.5 km || 
|-id=753 bgcolor=#d6d6d6
| 346753 ||  || — || January 16, 2009 || Kitt Peak || Spacewatch || — || align=right | 2.1 km || 
|-id=754 bgcolor=#d6d6d6
| 346754 ||  || — || January 16, 2009 || Kitt Peak || Spacewatch || — || align=right | 2.6 km || 
|-id=755 bgcolor=#d6d6d6
| 346755 ||  || — || January 16, 2009 || Kitt Peak || Spacewatch || — || align=right | 3.4 km || 
|-id=756 bgcolor=#d6d6d6
| 346756 ||  || — || January 16, 2009 || Kitt Peak || Spacewatch || KOR || align=right | 1.3 km || 
|-id=757 bgcolor=#E9E9E9
| 346757 ||  || — || January 16, 2009 || Kitt Peak || Spacewatch || — || align=right | 1.8 km || 
|-id=758 bgcolor=#d6d6d6
| 346758 ||  || — || January 16, 2009 || Kitt Peak || Spacewatch || — || align=right | 2.5 km || 
|-id=759 bgcolor=#d6d6d6
| 346759 ||  || — || January 16, 2009 || Kitt Peak || Spacewatch || EOS || align=right | 2.3 km || 
|-id=760 bgcolor=#d6d6d6
| 346760 ||  || — || January 16, 2009 || Mount Lemmon || Mount Lemmon Survey || — || align=right | 2.8 km || 
|-id=761 bgcolor=#d6d6d6
| 346761 ||  || — || January 18, 2009 || Kitt Peak || Spacewatch || — || align=right | 2.7 km || 
|-id=762 bgcolor=#E9E9E9
| 346762 ||  || — || January 18, 2009 || Mount Lemmon || Mount Lemmon Survey || — || align=right | 3.4 km || 
|-id=763 bgcolor=#FA8072
| 346763 ||  || — || January 16, 2009 || Purple Mountain || PMO NEO || — || align=right | 1.1 km || 
|-id=764 bgcolor=#d6d6d6
| 346764 ||  || — || January 17, 2009 || Kitt Peak || Spacewatch || — || align=right | 3.1 km || 
|-id=765 bgcolor=#E9E9E9
| 346765 ||  || — || January 17, 2009 || Kitt Peak || Spacewatch || — || align=right | 2.1 km || 
|-id=766 bgcolor=#E9E9E9
| 346766 ||  || — || January 18, 2009 || Catalina || CSS || GAL || align=right | 2.1 km || 
|-id=767 bgcolor=#E9E9E9
| 346767 ||  || — || January 18, 2009 || Purple Mountain || PMO NEO || WIT || align=right | 1.0 km || 
|-id=768 bgcolor=#E9E9E9
| 346768 ||  || — || January 30, 2009 || Socorro || LINEAR || — || align=right | 3.0 km || 
|-id=769 bgcolor=#d6d6d6
| 346769 ||  || — || January 1, 2009 || Kitt Peak || Spacewatch || — || align=right | 2.9 km || 
|-id=770 bgcolor=#E9E9E9
| 346770 ||  || — || December 22, 2008 || Kitt Peak || Spacewatch || — || align=right | 2.5 km || 
|-id=771 bgcolor=#E9E9E9
| 346771 ||  || — || January 25, 2009 || Kitt Peak || Spacewatch || — || align=right | 1.3 km || 
|-id=772 bgcolor=#E9E9E9
| 346772 ||  || — || January 25, 2009 || Kitt Peak || Spacewatch || MRX || align=right | 1.2 km || 
|-id=773 bgcolor=#E9E9E9
| 346773 ||  || — || January 25, 2009 || Kitt Peak || Spacewatch || AGN || align=right | 1.3 km || 
|-id=774 bgcolor=#d6d6d6
| 346774 ||  || — || January 26, 2009 || Mount Lemmon || Mount Lemmon Survey || KOR || align=right | 1.4 km || 
|-id=775 bgcolor=#d6d6d6
| 346775 ||  || — || January 26, 2009 || Mount Lemmon || Mount Lemmon Survey || — || align=right | 2.0 km || 
|-id=776 bgcolor=#d6d6d6
| 346776 ||  || — || January 28, 2009 || Catalina || CSS || — || align=right | 2.8 km || 
|-id=777 bgcolor=#E9E9E9
| 346777 ||  || — || January 28, 2009 || Catalina || CSS || AEO || align=right | 1.3 km || 
|-id=778 bgcolor=#d6d6d6
| 346778 ||  || — || January 26, 2009 || Kitt Peak || Spacewatch || ALA || align=right | 4.7 km || 
|-id=779 bgcolor=#E9E9E9
| 346779 ||  || — || January 26, 2009 || Kitt Peak || Spacewatch || — || align=right | 2.2 km || 
|-id=780 bgcolor=#d6d6d6
| 346780 ||  || — || January 31, 2009 || Kitt Peak || Spacewatch || — || align=right | 4.0 km || 
|-id=781 bgcolor=#d6d6d6
| 346781 ||  || — || January 31, 2009 || Kitt Peak || Spacewatch || — || align=right | 2.2 km || 
|-id=782 bgcolor=#d6d6d6
| 346782 ||  || — || January 20, 2009 || Kitt Peak || Spacewatch || HYG || align=right | 2.7 km || 
|-id=783 bgcolor=#d6d6d6
| 346783 ||  || — || January 29, 2009 || Mount Lemmon || Mount Lemmon Survey || — || align=right | 2.9 km || 
|-id=784 bgcolor=#d6d6d6
| 346784 ||  || — || January 31, 2009 || Mount Lemmon || Mount Lemmon Survey || EOS || align=right | 1.9 km || 
|-id=785 bgcolor=#E9E9E9
| 346785 ||  || — || January 31, 2009 || Kitt Peak || Spacewatch || — || align=right | 3.1 km || 
|-id=786 bgcolor=#E9E9E9
| 346786 ||  || — || January 29, 2009 || Kitt Peak || Spacewatch || — || align=right | 2.9 km || 
|-id=787 bgcolor=#d6d6d6
| 346787 ||  || — || January 30, 2009 || Kitt Peak || Spacewatch || KOR || align=right | 1.6 km || 
|-id=788 bgcolor=#d6d6d6
| 346788 ||  || — || January 30, 2009 || Kitt Peak || Spacewatch || EOS || align=right | 2.6 km || 
|-id=789 bgcolor=#d6d6d6
| 346789 ||  || — || January 30, 2009 || Kitt Peak || Spacewatch || — || align=right | 2.3 km || 
|-id=790 bgcolor=#d6d6d6
| 346790 ||  || — || January 30, 2009 || Mount Lemmon || Mount Lemmon Survey || EOS || align=right | 1.9 km || 
|-id=791 bgcolor=#E9E9E9
| 346791 ||  || — || January 31, 2009 || Kitt Peak || Spacewatch || — || align=right | 2.1 km || 
|-id=792 bgcolor=#E9E9E9
| 346792 ||  || — || January 31, 2009 || Kitt Peak || Spacewatch || AST || align=right | 1.7 km || 
|-id=793 bgcolor=#E9E9E9
| 346793 ||  || — || January 31, 2009 || Kitt Peak || Spacewatch || — || align=right | 1.5 km || 
|-id=794 bgcolor=#E9E9E9
| 346794 ||  || — || January 31, 2009 || Kitt Peak || Spacewatch || XIZ || align=right | 1.4 km || 
|-id=795 bgcolor=#d6d6d6
| 346795 ||  || — || January 31, 2009 || Kitt Peak || Spacewatch || — || align=right | 2.6 km || 
|-id=796 bgcolor=#d6d6d6
| 346796 ||  || — || January 31, 2009 || Kitt Peak || Spacewatch || VER || align=right | 2.6 km || 
|-id=797 bgcolor=#E9E9E9
| 346797 ||  || — || January 20, 2009 || Kitt Peak || Spacewatch || AST || align=right | 1.8 km || 
|-id=798 bgcolor=#d6d6d6
| 346798 ||  || — || January 25, 2009 || Kitt Peak || Spacewatch || SYL7:4 || align=right | 4.7 km || 
|-id=799 bgcolor=#d6d6d6
| 346799 ||  || — || January 25, 2009 || Kitt Peak || Spacewatch || — || align=right | 2.2 km || 
|-id=800 bgcolor=#d6d6d6
| 346800 ||  || — || January 26, 2009 || Purple Mountain || PMO NEO || EOS || align=right | 2.4 km || 
|}

346801–346900 

|-bgcolor=#d6d6d6
| 346801 ||  || — || January 31, 2009 || Kitt Peak || Spacewatch || — || align=right | 2.5 km || 
|-id=802 bgcolor=#d6d6d6
| 346802 ||  || — || January 31, 2009 || Mount Lemmon || Mount Lemmon Survey || — || align=right | 2.5 km || 
|-id=803 bgcolor=#E9E9E9
| 346803 ||  || — || January 18, 2009 || Catalina || CSS || — || align=right | 2.9 km || 
|-id=804 bgcolor=#E9E9E9
| 346804 ||  || — || January 25, 2009 || Catalina || CSS || — || align=right | 1.8 km || 
|-id=805 bgcolor=#d6d6d6
| 346805 ||  || — || February 2, 2009 || Moletai || K. Černis, J. Zdanavičius || — || align=right | 2.4 km || 
|-id=806 bgcolor=#d6d6d6
| 346806 ||  || — || February 3, 2009 || Kitt Peak || Spacewatch || HYG || align=right | 2.9 km || 
|-id=807 bgcolor=#d6d6d6
| 346807 ||  || — || February 15, 2009 || Calar Alto || F. Hormuth || — || align=right | 3.3 km || 
|-id=808 bgcolor=#E9E9E9
| 346808 ||  || — || February 1, 2009 || Kitt Peak || Spacewatch || HEN || align=right | 1.1 km || 
|-id=809 bgcolor=#d6d6d6
| 346809 ||  || — || February 2, 2009 || Mount Lemmon || Mount Lemmon Survey || — || align=right | 2.8 km || 
|-id=810 bgcolor=#E9E9E9
| 346810 Giancabattisti ||  ||  || February 13, 2009 || Vallemare di Borbona || V. S. Casulli || GEF || align=right | 1.6 km || 
|-id=811 bgcolor=#E9E9E9
| 346811 ||  || — || February 14, 2009 || Catalina || CSS || — || align=right | 2.7 km || 
|-id=812 bgcolor=#d6d6d6
| 346812 ||  || — || February 13, 2009 || Kitt Peak || Spacewatch || — || align=right | 3.1 km || 
|-id=813 bgcolor=#E9E9E9
| 346813 ||  || — || February 13, 2009 || Kitt Peak || Spacewatch || HOF || align=right | 2.6 km || 
|-id=814 bgcolor=#E9E9E9
| 346814 ||  || — || February 14, 2009 || Mount Lemmon || Mount Lemmon Survey || AGN || align=right | 1.4 km || 
|-id=815 bgcolor=#E9E9E9
| 346815 ||  || — || February 14, 2009 || La Sagra || OAM Obs. || — || align=right | 1.2 km || 
|-id=816 bgcolor=#d6d6d6
| 346816 ||  || — || February 14, 2009 || Mount Lemmon || Mount Lemmon Survey || — || align=right | 2.4 km || 
|-id=817 bgcolor=#d6d6d6
| 346817 ||  || — || February 15, 2009 || Catalina || CSS || — || align=right | 3.5 km || 
|-id=818 bgcolor=#d6d6d6
| 346818 ||  || — || February 2, 2009 || Kitt Peak || Spacewatch || KOR || align=right | 1.3 km || 
|-id=819 bgcolor=#d6d6d6
| 346819 ||  || — || February 2, 2009 || Kitt Peak || Spacewatch || — || align=right | 2.5 km || 
|-id=820 bgcolor=#d6d6d6
| 346820 ||  || — || February 5, 2009 || Kitt Peak || Spacewatch || HYG || align=right | 3.5 km || 
|-id=821 bgcolor=#d6d6d6
| 346821 ||  || — || May 26, 2006 || Mount Lemmon || Mount Lemmon Survey || — || align=right | 3.7 km || 
|-id=822 bgcolor=#d6d6d6
| 346822 ||  || — || February 5, 2009 || Kitt Peak || Spacewatch || THM || align=right | 2.2 km || 
|-id=823 bgcolor=#d6d6d6
| 346823 ||  || — || February 2, 2009 || Kitt Peak || Spacewatch || — || align=right | 3.1 km || 
|-id=824 bgcolor=#d6d6d6
| 346824 ||  || — || February 3, 2009 || Mount Lemmon || Mount Lemmon Survey || EOS || align=right | 1.9 km || 
|-id=825 bgcolor=#d6d6d6
| 346825 ||  || — || February 5, 2009 || Kitt Peak || Spacewatch || — || align=right | 2.9 km || 
|-id=826 bgcolor=#d6d6d6
| 346826 ||  || — || February 16, 2009 || Dauban || F. Kugel || — || align=right | 3.4 km || 
|-id=827 bgcolor=#E9E9E9
| 346827 ||  || — || February 19, 2009 || Sierra Stars || F. Tozzi || — || align=right | 1.5 km || 
|-id=828 bgcolor=#E9E9E9
| 346828 ||  || — || February 18, 2009 || Socorro || LINEAR || — || align=right | 3.1 km || 
|-id=829 bgcolor=#d6d6d6
| 346829 ||  || — || February 19, 2009 || Mayhill || A. Lowe || — || align=right | 4.3 km || 
|-id=830 bgcolor=#d6d6d6
| 346830 ||  || — || February 19, 2009 || Socorro || LINEAR || — || align=right | 3.6 km || 
|-id=831 bgcolor=#d6d6d6
| 346831 ||  || — || February 21, 2009 || Cordell-Lorenz || D. T. Durig || — || align=right | 2.7 km || 
|-id=832 bgcolor=#d6d6d6
| 346832 ||  || — || February 16, 2009 || Kitt Peak || Spacewatch || — || align=right | 4.2 km || 
|-id=833 bgcolor=#E9E9E9
| 346833 ||  || — || February 16, 2009 || La Sagra || OAM Obs. || — || align=right | 1.1 km || 
|-id=834 bgcolor=#d6d6d6
| 346834 ||  || — || February 17, 2009 || La Sagra || OAM Obs. || KOR || align=right | 1.7 km || 
|-id=835 bgcolor=#d6d6d6
| 346835 ||  || — || February 22, 2009 || Calar Alto || F. Hormuth || VER || align=right | 3.2 km || 
|-id=836 bgcolor=#d6d6d6
| 346836 ||  || — || February 20, 2009 || Kitt Peak || Spacewatch || — || align=right | 3.4 km || 
|-id=837 bgcolor=#d6d6d6
| 346837 ||  || — || February 24, 2009 || Dauban || F. Kugel || — || align=right | 3.4 km || 
|-id=838 bgcolor=#d6d6d6
| 346838 ||  || — || February 19, 2009 || Kitt Peak || Spacewatch || — || align=right | 3.2 km || 
|-id=839 bgcolor=#d6d6d6
| 346839 ||  || — || February 22, 2009 || Kitt Peak || Spacewatch || — || align=right | 2.8 km || 
|-id=840 bgcolor=#d6d6d6
| 346840 ||  || — || February 22, 2009 || Kitt Peak || Spacewatch || EOS || align=right | 2.1 km || 
|-id=841 bgcolor=#d6d6d6
| 346841 ||  || — || February 21, 2009 || Mount Lemmon || Mount Lemmon Survey || — || align=right | 2.6 km || 
|-id=842 bgcolor=#E9E9E9
| 346842 ||  || — || February 22, 2009 || Mount Lemmon || Mount Lemmon Survey || — || align=right | 1.4 km || 
|-id=843 bgcolor=#d6d6d6
| 346843 ||  || — || February 28, 2009 || Mount Lemmon || Mount Lemmon Survey || — || align=right | 4.1 km || 
|-id=844 bgcolor=#d6d6d6
| 346844 ||  || — || February 25, 2009 || Catalina || CSS || — || align=right | 3.5 km || 
|-id=845 bgcolor=#d6d6d6
| 346845 ||  || — || February 25, 2009 || Catalina || CSS || — || align=right | 3.8 km || 
|-id=846 bgcolor=#d6d6d6
| 346846 ||  || — || January 30, 2009 || Siding Spring || SSS || — || align=right | 3.5 km || 
|-id=847 bgcolor=#d6d6d6
| 346847 ||  || — || February 26, 2009 || Catalina || CSS || — || align=right | 2.2 km || 
|-id=848 bgcolor=#d6d6d6
| 346848 ||  || — || February 27, 2009 || Kitt Peak || Spacewatch || HYG || align=right | 3.3 km || 
|-id=849 bgcolor=#d6d6d6
| 346849 ||  || — || February 26, 2004 || Kitt Peak || M. W. Buie || — || align=right | 2.1 km || 
|-id=850 bgcolor=#d6d6d6
| 346850 ||  || — || August 28, 2006 || Kitt Peak || Spacewatch || — || align=right | 3.1 km || 
|-id=851 bgcolor=#d6d6d6
| 346851 ||  || — || February 27, 2009 || Kitt Peak || Spacewatch || — || align=right | 2.7 km || 
|-id=852 bgcolor=#d6d6d6
| 346852 ||  || — || February 19, 2009 || Kitt Peak || Spacewatch || KOR || align=right | 1.4 km || 
|-id=853 bgcolor=#d6d6d6
| 346853 ||  || — || February 24, 2009 || Catalina || CSS || — || align=right | 3.9 km || 
|-id=854 bgcolor=#d6d6d6
| 346854 ||  || — || February 26, 2009 || Mount Lemmon || Mount Lemmon Survey || — || align=right | 2.4 km || 
|-id=855 bgcolor=#d6d6d6
| 346855 ||  || — || March 1, 2009 || Great Shefford || P. Birtwhistle || THM || align=right | 2.6 km || 
|-id=856 bgcolor=#d6d6d6
| 346856 ||  || — || March 15, 2009 || Kitt Peak || Spacewatch || — || align=right | 3.0 km || 
|-id=857 bgcolor=#d6d6d6
| 346857 ||  || — || March 15, 2009 || Kitt Peak || Spacewatch || — || align=right | 3.2 km || 
|-id=858 bgcolor=#d6d6d6
| 346858 ||  || — || March 15, 2009 || Mount Lemmon || Mount Lemmon Survey || THM || align=right | 2.4 km || 
|-id=859 bgcolor=#d6d6d6
| 346859 ||  || — || March 14, 2009 || La Sagra || OAM Obs. || — || align=right | 2.8 km || 
|-id=860 bgcolor=#d6d6d6
| 346860 ||  || — || March 7, 2009 || Mount Lemmon || Mount Lemmon Survey || — || align=right | 3.2 km || 
|-id=861 bgcolor=#d6d6d6
| 346861 ||  || — || March 3, 2009 || Catalina || CSS || URS || align=right | 6.1 km || 
|-id=862 bgcolor=#d6d6d6
| 346862 ||  || — || March 8, 2009 || Mount Lemmon || Mount Lemmon Survey || — || align=right | 2.9 km || 
|-id=863 bgcolor=#d6d6d6
| 346863 ||  || — || March 1, 2009 || Mount Lemmon || Mount Lemmon Survey || — || align=right | 3.7 km || 
|-id=864 bgcolor=#d6d6d6
| 346864 ||  || — || March 7, 2009 || Mount Lemmon || Mount Lemmon Survey || EOS || align=right | 2.3 km || 
|-id=865 bgcolor=#d6d6d6
| 346865 ||  || — || March 17, 2009 || Taunus || E. Schwab, U. Zimmer || TEL || align=right | 1.5 km || 
|-id=866 bgcolor=#d6d6d6
| 346866 ||  || — || November 11, 2001 || Apache Point || SDSS || — || align=right | 3.6 km || 
|-id=867 bgcolor=#d6d6d6
| 346867 ||  || — || March 17, 2009 || Kitt Peak || Spacewatch || — || align=right | 3.0 km || 
|-id=868 bgcolor=#d6d6d6
| 346868 ||  || — || March 20, 2009 || La Cañada || J. Lacruz || — || align=right | 2.2 km || 
|-id=869 bgcolor=#d6d6d6
| 346869 ||  || — || March 21, 2009 || La Sagra || OAM Obs. || — || align=right | 3.6 km || 
|-id=870 bgcolor=#E9E9E9
| 346870 ||  || — || February 24, 2009 || Catalina || CSS || — || align=right | 3.5 km || 
|-id=871 bgcolor=#d6d6d6
| 346871 ||  || — || March 16, 2009 || Mount Lemmon || Mount Lemmon Survey || — || align=right | 2.8 km || 
|-id=872 bgcolor=#d6d6d6
| 346872 ||  || — || March 27, 2009 || Kitt Peak || Spacewatch || THM || align=right | 2.4 km || 
|-id=873 bgcolor=#d6d6d6
| 346873 ||  || — || March 28, 2009 || Mount Lemmon || Mount Lemmon Survey || — || align=right | 3.3 km || 
|-id=874 bgcolor=#d6d6d6
| 346874 ||  || — || March 27, 2009 || Mount Lemmon || Mount Lemmon Survey || HYG || align=right | 3.1 km || 
|-id=875 bgcolor=#d6d6d6
| 346875 ||  || — || March 27, 2009 || Catalina || CSS || URS || align=right | 3.8 km || 
|-id=876 bgcolor=#E9E9E9
| 346876 ||  || — || March 21, 2009 || Mount Lemmon || Mount Lemmon Survey || — || align=right | 1.5 km || 
|-id=877 bgcolor=#d6d6d6
| 346877 ||  || — || March 31, 2009 || Kitt Peak || Spacewatch || — || align=right | 2.9 km || 
|-id=878 bgcolor=#d6d6d6
| 346878 ||  || — || March 18, 2009 || Mount Lemmon || Mount Lemmon Survey || THM || align=right | 2.4 km || 
|-id=879 bgcolor=#d6d6d6
| 346879 ||  || — || April 18, 2009 || Kitt Peak || Spacewatch || — || align=right | 2.5 km || 
|-id=880 bgcolor=#E9E9E9
| 346880 ||  || — || April 19, 2009 || Kitt Peak || Spacewatch || JUN || align=right | 1.4 km || 
|-id=881 bgcolor=#d6d6d6
| 346881 ||  || — || April 19, 2009 || Kitt Peak || Spacewatch || — || align=right | 2.6 km || 
|-id=882 bgcolor=#d6d6d6
| 346882 ||  || — || April 19, 2009 || Kitt Peak || Spacewatch || EOS || align=right | 2.5 km || 
|-id=883 bgcolor=#C2FFFF
| 346883 ||  || — || May 1, 2009 || Cerro Burek || Alianza S4 Obs. || L5 || align=right | 11 km || 
|-id=884 bgcolor=#d6d6d6
| 346884 ||  || — || May 15, 2009 || La Sagra || OAM Obs. || 7:4 || align=right | 6.2 km || 
|-id=885 bgcolor=#C2FFFF
| 346885 ||  || — || May 14, 2009 || Mount Lemmon || Mount Lemmon Survey || L5 || align=right | 14 km || 
|-id=886 bgcolor=#fefefe
| 346886 Middelburg || 2009 MB ||  || November 15, 1999 || Uccle || E. W. Elst || H || align=right data-sort-value="0.68" | 680 m || 
|-id=887 bgcolor=#d6d6d6
| 346887 ||  || — || July 28, 2009 || Kitt Peak || Spacewatch || — || align=right | 4.2 km || 
|-id=888 bgcolor=#fefefe
| 346888 ||  || — || August 15, 2009 || La Sagra || OAM Obs. || H || align=right data-sort-value="0.89" | 890 m || 
|-id=889 bgcolor=#C7FF8F
| 346889 Rhiphonos ||  ||  || August 28, 2009 || Zelenchukskaya || T. V. Kryachko || centaurcritical || align=right | 23 km || 
|-id=890 bgcolor=#fefefe
| 346890 ||  || — || September 14, 2009 || Kitt Peak || Spacewatch || V || align=right data-sort-value="0.69" | 690 m || 
|-id=891 bgcolor=#fefefe
| 346891 ||  || — || September 15, 2009 || Kitt Peak || Spacewatch || FLO || align=right data-sort-value="0.70" | 700 m || 
|-id=892 bgcolor=#FA8072
| 346892 ||  || — || September 15, 2009 || Kitt Peak || Spacewatch || — || align=right data-sort-value="0.66" | 660 m || 
|-id=893 bgcolor=#fefefe
| 346893 ||  || — || September 15, 2009 || Kitt Peak || Spacewatch || — || align=right data-sort-value="0.74" | 740 m || 
|-id=894 bgcolor=#fefefe
| 346894 ||  || — || September 15, 2009 || Kitt Peak || Spacewatch || — || align=right data-sort-value="0.71" | 710 m || 
|-id=895 bgcolor=#fefefe
| 346895 ||  || — || September 16, 2009 || Kitt Peak || Spacewatch || — || align=right data-sort-value="0.98" | 980 m || 
|-id=896 bgcolor=#fefefe
| 346896 ||  || — || September 17, 2009 || Moletai || K. Černis, J. Zdanavičius || — || align=right data-sort-value="0.81" | 810 m || 
|-id=897 bgcolor=#fefefe
| 346897 ||  || — || September 26, 2009 || Catalina || CSS || H || align=right data-sort-value="0.88" | 880 m || 
|-id=898 bgcolor=#fefefe
| 346898 ||  || — || September 18, 2009 || Kitt Peak || Spacewatch || FLO || align=right data-sort-value="0.69" | 690 m || 
|-id=899 bgcolor=#E9E9E9
| 346899 ||  || — || September 17, 2009 || Kitt Peak || Spacewatch || critical || align=right | 2.3 km || 
|-id=900 bgcolor=#fefefe
| 346900 ||  || — || October 14, 2009 || Catalina || CSS || V || align=right data-sort-value="0.78" | 780 m || 
|}

346901–347000 

|-bgcolor=#fefefe
| 346901 ||  || — || October 14, 2009 || Kitt Peak || Spacewatch || — || align=right data-sort-value="0.67" | 670 m || 
|-id=902 bgcolor=#fefefe
| 346902 ||  || — || October 18, 2009 || Catalina || CSS || H || align=right | 1.0 km || 
|-id=903 bgcolor=#fefefe
| 346903 ||  || — || October 18, 2009 || Kitt Peak || Spacewatch || H || align=right data-sort-value="0.84" | 840 m || 
|-id=904 bgcolor=#fefefe
| 346904 ||  || — || October 22, 2009 || Catalina || CSS || V || align=right data-sort-value="0.90" | 900 m || 
|-id=905 bgcolor=#fefefe
| 346905 ||  || — || October 16, 2009 || Catalina || CSS || H || align=right data-sort-value="0.85" | 850 m || 
|-id=906 bgcolor=#fefefe
| 346906 ||  || — || November 9, 2009 || Mount Lemmon || Mount Lemmon Survey || V || align=right data-sort-value="0.79" | 790 m || 
|-id=907 bgcolor=#fefefe
| 346907 ||  || — || April 1, 2008 || Kitt Peak || Spacewatch || — || align=right data-sort-value="0.75" | 750 m || 
|-id=908 bgcolor=#fefefe
| 346908 ||  || — || November 10, 2009 || Catalina || CSS || — || align=right | 1.6 km || 
|-id=909 bgcolor=#fefefe
| 346909 ||  || — || November 17, 2009 || Kitt Peak || Spacewatch || — || align=right data-sort-value="0.71" | 710 m || 
|-id=910 bgcolor=#fefefe
| 346910 ||  || — || November 20, 2009 || Kitt Peak || Spacewatch || — || align=right data-sort-value="0.69" | 690 m || 
|-id=911 bgcolor=#fefefe
| 346911 ||  || — || November 10, 2009 || Kitt Peak || Spacewatch || — || align=right data-sort-value="0.75" | 750 m || 
|-id=912 bgcolor=#fefefe
| 346912 ||  || — || November 19, 2009 || Kitt Peak || Spacewatch || — || align=right data-sort-value="0.89" | 890 m || 
|-id=913 bgcolor=#fefefe
| 346913 ||  || — || April 24, 2001 || Kitt Peak || Spacewatch || FLO || align=right data-sort-value="0.88" | 880 m || 
|-id=914 bgcolor=#fefefe
| 346914 ||  || — || November 20, 2009 || Mount Lemmon || Mount Lemmon Survey || FLO || align=right data-sort-value="0.76" | 760 m || 
|-id=915 bgcolor=#fefefe
| 346915 ||  || — || November 20, 2009 || Kitt Peak || Spacewatch || — || align=right data-sort-value="0.75" | 750 m || 
|-id=916 bgcolor=#fefefe
| 346916 ||  || — || November 16, 2009 || Kitt Peak || Spacewatch || V || align=right data-sort-value="0.67" | 670 m || 
|-id=917 bgcolor=#fefefe
| 346917 ||  || — || November 20, 2009 || Mount Lemmon || Mount Lemmon Survey || NYS || align=right data-sort-value="0.70" | 700 m || 
|-id=918 bgcolor=#fefefe
| 346918 ||  || — || December 15, 2009 || Mount Lemmon || Mount Lemmon Survey || V || align=right data-sort-value="0.71" | 710 m || 
|-id=919 bgcolor=#fefefe
| 346919 ||  || — || October 22, 2005 || Catalina || CSS || V || align=right data-sort-value="0.84" | 840 m || 
|-id=920 bgcolor=#fefefe
| 346920 ||  || — || December 10, 2009 || Mount Lemmon || Mount Lemmon Survey || — || align=right data-sort-value="0.81" | 810 m || 
|-id=921 bgcolor=#E9E9E9
| 346921 ||  || — || December 10, 2009 || Mount Lemmon || Mount Lemmon Survey || HOF || align=right | 2.8 km || 
|-id=922 bgcolor=#fefefe
| 346922 ||  || — || December 17, 2009 || Mount Lemmon || Mount Lemmon Survey || FLO || align=right data-sort-value="0.75" | 750 m || 
|-id=923 bgcolor=#fefefe
| 346923 ||  || — || December 27, 2009 || Kitt Peak || Spacewatch || V || align=right data-sort-value="0.83" | 830 m || 
|-id=924 bgcolor=#fefefe
| 346924 ||  || — || December 18, 2009 || Mount Lemmon || Mount Lemmon Survey || — || align=right data-sort-value="0.68" | 680 m || 
|-id=925 bgcolor=#fefefe
| 346925 ||  || — || December 27, 2009 || Kitt Peak || Spacewatch || ERI || align=right | 1.7 km || 
|-id=926 bgcolor=#fefefe
| 346926 ||  || — || January 7, 2010 || Bisei SG Center || BATTeRS || FLO || align=right data-sort-value="0.60" | 600 m || 
|-id=927 bgcolor=#fefefe
| 346927 ||  || — || January 7, 2010 || Mount Lemmon || Mount Lemmon Survey || — || align=right data-sort-value="0.94" | 940 m || 
|-id=928 bgcolor=#fefefe
| 346928 ||  || — || January 6, 2010 || Kitt Peak || Spacewatch || — || align=right data-sort-value="0.86" | 860 m || 
|-id=929 bgcolor=#fefefe
| 346929 ||  || — || January 6, 2010 || Kitt Peak || Spacewatch || — || align=right | 2.0 km || 
|-id=930 bgcolor=#fefefe
| 346930 ||  || — || January 7, 2010 || Kitt Peak || Spacewatch || — || align=right data-sort-value="0.73" | 730 m || 
|-id=931 bgcolor=#FA8072
| 346931 ||  || — || January 7, 2010 || Kitt Peak || Spacewatch || — || align=right | 1.3 km || 
|-id=932 bgcolor=#E9E9E9
| 346932 ||  || — || December 18, 2009 || Mount Lemmon || Mount Lemmon Survey || — || align=right | 1.4 km || 
|-id=933 bgcolor=#fefefe
| 346933 ||  || — || January 7, 2010 || Kitt Peak || Spacewatch || — || align=right | 1.1 km || 
|-id=934 bgcolor=#fefefe
| 346934 ||  || — || November 24, 2006 || Mount Lemmon || Mount Lemmon Survey || — || align=right | 1.00 km || 
|-id=935 bgcolor=#fefefe
| 346935 ||  || — || January 8, 2010 || Kitt Peak || Spacewatch || FLO || align=right | 1.6 km || 
|-id=936 bgcolor=#fefefe
| 346936 ||  || — || January 8, 2010 || Kitt Peak || Spacewatch || FLO || align=right data-sort-value="0.78" | 780 m || 
|-id=937 bgcolor=#E9E9E9
| 346937 ||  || — || January 8, 2010 || Kitt Peak || Spacewatch || — || align=right | 1.2 km || 
|-id=938 bgcolor=#fefefe
| 346938 ||  || — || March 31, 2003 || Kitt Peak || Spacewatch || V || align=right data-sort-value="0.79" | 790 m || 
|-id=939 bgcolor=#fefefe
| 346939 ||  || — || March 11, 2003 || Palomar || NEAT || V || align=right data-sort-value="0.72" | 720 m || 
|-id=940 bgcolor=#fefefe
| 346940 ||  || — || January 8, 2010 || Kitt Peak || Spacewatch || EUT || align=right data-sort-value="0.62" | 620 m || 
|-id=941 bgcolor=#fefefe
| 346941 ||  || — || January 6, 2010 || Catalina || CSS || — || align=right | 1.3 km || 
|-id=942 bgcolor=#fefefe
| 346942 ||  || — || January 6, 2010 || Kitt Peak || Spacewatch || — || align=right data-sort-value="0.75" | 750 m || 
|-id=943 bgcolor=#E9E9E9
| 346943 ||  || — || September 7, 2008 || Mount Lemmon || Mount Lemmon Survey || — || align=right | 1.7 km || 
|-id=944 bgcolor=#fefefe
| 346944 ||  || — || January 13, 2010 || Mount Lemmon || Mount Lemmon Survey || — || align=right | 1.2 km || 
|-id=945 bgcolor=#fefefe
| 346945 ||  || — || January 13, 2010 || Socorro || LINEAR || CIM || align=right | 3.6 km || 
|-id=946 bgcolor=#fefefe
| 346946 ||  || — || January 13, 2010 || Socorro || LINEAR || — || align=right data-sort-value="0.99" | 990 m || 
|-id=947 bgcolor=#fefefe
| 346947 ||  || — || October 1, 2005 || Catalina || CSS || V || align=right data-sort-value="0.82" | 820 m || 
|-id=948 bgcolor=#d6d6d6
| 346948 ||  || — || January 12, 2010 || Catalina || CSS || — || align=right | 4.5 km || 
|-id=949 bgcolor=#fefefe
| 346949 ||  || — || January 8, 2010 || WISE || WISE || KLI || align=right | 1.6 km || 
|-id=950 bgcolor=#E9E9E9
| 346950 ||  || — || January 8, 2010 || WISE || WISE || — || align=right | 2.9 km || 
|-id=951 bgcolor=#E9E9E9
| 346951 ||  || — || January 8, 2010 || WISE || WISE || — || align=right | 2.0 km || 
|-id=952 bgcolor=#E9E9E9
| 346952 ||  || — || January 8, 2010 || WISE || WISE || — || align=right | 2.1 km || 
|-id=953 bgcolor=#d6d6d6
| 346953 ||  || — || August 17, 2001 || Palomar || NEAT || — || align=right | 4.8 km || 
|-id=954 bgcolor=#E9E9E9
| 346954 ||  || — || January 12, 2010 || WISE || WISE || — || align=right | 3.1 km || 
|-id=955 bgcolor=#E9E9E9
| 346955 ||  || — || December 10, 2004 || Kitt Peak || Spacewatch || GER || align=right | 1.7 km || 
|-id=956 bgcolor=#d6d6d6
| 346956 ||  || — || January 13, 2010 || WISE || WISE || — || align=right | 4.1 km || 
|-id=957 bgcolor=#fefefe
| 346957 ||  || — || January 23, 2010 || Siding Spring || SSS || PHO || align=right | 1.8 km || 
|-id=958 bgcolor=#d6d6d6
| 346958 ||  || — || January 20, 2010 || WISE || WISE || — || align=right | 4.0 km || 
|-id=959 bgcolor=#d6d6d6
| 346959 ||  || — || November 7, 2007 || Kitt Peak || Spacewatch || — || align=right | 4.2 km || 
|-id=960 bgcolor=#E9E9E9
| 346960 ||  || — || January 24, 2010 || WISE || WISE || HNS || align=right | 2.5 km || 
|-id=961 bgcolor=#FA8072
| 346961 ||  || — || February 2, 2010 || La Sagra || OAM Obs. || — || align=right data-sort-value="0.84" | 840 m || 
|-id=962 bgcolor=#fefefe
| 346962 ||  || — || February 6, 2010 || Mount Lemmon || Mount Lemmon Survey || — || align=right data-sort-value="0.65" | 650 m || 
|-id=963 bgcolor=#fefefe
| 346963 ||  || — || January 10, 2003 || Kitt Peak || Spacewatch || FLO || align=right data-sort-value="0.80" | 800 m || 
|-id=964 bgcolor=#fefefe
| 346964 ||  || — || February 6, 2010 || La Sagra || OAM Obs. || — || align=right data-sort-value="0.98" | 980 m || 
|-id=965 bgcolor=#fefefe
| 346965 ||  || — || February 6, 2010 || La Sagra || OAM Obs. || NYS || align=right data-sort-value="0.74" | 740 m || 
|-id=966 bgcolor=#E9E9E9
| 346966 ||  || — || February 6, 2010 || WISE || WISE || DOR || align=right | 2.9 km || 
|-id=967 bgcolor=#E9E9E9
| 346967 ||  || — || February 7, 2010 || WISE || WISE || — || align=right | 2.8 km || 
|-id=968 bgcolor=#E9E9E9
| 346968 ||  || — || February 9, 2010 || Kitt Peak || Spacewatch || — || align=right | 1.4 km || 
|-id=969 bgcolor=#E9E9E9
| 346969 ||  || — || February 9, 2010 || Kitt Peak || Spacewatch || — || align=right data-sort-value="0.83" | 830 m || 
|-id=970 bgcolor=#fefefe
| 346970 ||  || — || February 10, 2010 || Kitt Peak || Spacewatch || — || align=right data-sort-value="0.80" | 800 m || 
|-id=971 bgcolor=#fefefe
| 346971 ||  || — || September 30, 2005 || Mount Lemmon || Mount Lemmon Survey || — || align=right data-sort-value="0.94" | 940 m || 
|-id=972 bgcolor=#E9E9E9
| 346972 ||  || — || February 10, 2010 || Kitt Peak || Spacewatch || — || align=right | 2.4 km || 
|-id=973 bgcolor=#E9E9E9
| 346973 ||  || — || April 28, 2006 || Cerro Tololo || M. W. Buie || — || align=right | 2.1 km || 
|-id=974 bgcolor=#fefefe
| 346974 ||  || — || February 10, 2010 || Kitt Peak || Spacewatch || — || align=right | 1.0 km || 
|-id=975 bgcolor=#fefefe
| 346975 ||  || — || February 13, 2010 || Mount Lemmon || Mount Lemmon Survey || V || align=right data-sort-value="0.83" | 830 m || 
|-id=976 bgcolor=#fefefe
| 346976 ||  || — || February 9, 2010 || Catalina || CSS || FLO || align=right data-sort-value="0.84" | 840 m || 
|-id=977 bgcolor=#E9E9E9
| 346977 ||  || — || January 7, 2006 || Mount Lemmon || Mount Lemmon Survey || — || align=right | 1.1 km || 
|-id=978 bgcolor=#fefefe
| 346978 ||  || — || February 9, 2010 || Kitt Peak || Spacewatch || MAS || align=right data-sort-value="0.83" | 830 m || 
|-id=979 bgcolor=#E9E9E9
| 346979 ||  || — || February 10, 2010 || Kitt Peak || Spacewatch || — || align=right data-sort-value="0.93" | 930 m || 
|-id=980 bgcolor=#E9E9E9
| 346980 ||  || — || February 13, 2010 || Kitt Peak || Spacewatch || — || align=right | 1.6 km || 
|-id=981 bgcolor=#E9E9E9
| 346981 ||  || — || February 13, 2010 || Kitt Peak || Spacewatch || — || align=right | 1.6 km || 
|-id=982 bgcolor=#fefefe
| 346982 ||  || — || February 14, 2010 || Kitt Peak || Spacewatch || MAS || align=right data-sort-value="0.72" | 720 m || 
|-id=983 bgcolor=#E9E9E9
| 346983 ||  || — || September 29, 2008 || Mount Lemmon || Mount Lemmon Survey || HEN || align=right | 1.1 km || 
|-id=984 bgcolor=#E9E9E9
| 346984 ||  || — || February 14, 2010 || Mount Lemmon || Mount Lemmon Survey || — || align=right | 2.3 km || 
|-id=985 bgcolor=#fefefe
| 346985 ||  || — || February 14, 2010 || Kitt Peak || Spacewatch || MAS || align=right data-sort-value="0.75" | 750 m || 
|-id=986 bgcolor=#fefefe
| 346986 ||  || — || February 14, 2010 || Mount Lemmon || Mount Lemmon Survey || NYS || align=right data-sort-value="0.60" | 600 m || 
|-id=987 bgcolor=#E9E9E9
| 346987 ||  || — || February 15, 2010 || Kitt Peak || Spacewatch || — || align=right | 2.7 km || 
|-id=988 bgcolor=#E9E9E9
| 346988 ||  || — || February 15, 2010 || Kitt Peak || Spacewatch || MRX || align=right data-sort-value="0.94" | 940 m || 
|-id=989 bgcolor=#E9E9E9
| 346989 ||  || — || February 10, 2010 || WISE || WISE || — || align=right | 2.7 km || 
|-id=990 bgcolor=#fefefe
| 346990 ||  || — || February 14, 2010 || Kitt Peak || Spacewatch || — || align=right data-sort-value="0.90" | 900 m || 
|-id=991 bgcolor=#fefefe
| 346991 ||  || — || May 10, 2003 || Kitt Peak || Spacewatch || MAS || align=right data-sort-value="0.84" | 840 m || 
|-id=992 bgcolor=#fefefe
| 346992 ||  || — || February 9, 2010 || Kitt Peak || Spacewatch || — || align=right data-sort-value="0.76" | 760 m || 
|-id=993 bgcolor=#fefefe
| 346993 ||  || — || January 27, 2003 || Socorro || LINEAR || — || align=right data-sort-value="0.81" | 810 m || 
|-id=994 bgcolor=#E9E9E9
| 346994 ||  || — || February 15, 2010 || Kitt Peak || Spacewatch || — || align=right | 2.4 km || 
|-id=995 bgcolor=#E9E9E9
| 346995 ||  || — || February 13, 2010 || Kitt Peak || Spacewatch || — || align=right | 2.1 km || 
|-id=996 bgcolor=#E9E9E9
| 346996 ||  || — || February 6, 2010 || Kitt Peak || Spacewatch || EUN || align=right | 2.0 km || 
|-id=997 bgcolor=#E9E9E9
| 346997 ||  || — || February 13, 2010 || Kitt Peak || Spacewatch || HEN || align=right | 1.2 km || 
|-id=998 bgcolor=#fefefe
| 346998 ||  || — || February 15, 2010 || Haleakala || Pan-STARRS || — || align=right | 1.2 km || 
|-id=999 bgcolor=#E9E9E9
| 346999 ||  || — || February 15, 2010 || Haleakala || Pan-STARRS || AGN || align=right | 1.3 km || 
|-id=000 bgcolor=#d6d6d6
| 347000 ||  || — || February 7, 2010 || WISE || WISE || — || align=right | 3.6 km || 
|}

References

External links 
 Discovery Circumstances: Numbered Minor Planets (345001)–(350000) (IAU Minor Planet Center)

0346